This article documents the timeline of the COVID-19 pandemic in Indonesia in 2022.

January
 1 January
 63,343,702 specimens had been tested from 42,614,359 people using RT-PCR, TCM, and antigen rapid tests. There were 3,376 suspected cases.
 Indonesia confirmed 274 new cases, bringing the total number to 4,262,994. 165 patients recovered, bringing the number to 4,114,499. 2 patients deceased, bringing the tally to 144,096. 510 municipalities and regencies had reported at least one positive case.
 As of 18:00 WIB (UTC+7), 161,897,269 people had taken the first dose of vaccine while 114,038,105 had completed the process with the second dose. Oddly, there were 1,288,793 health professionals who had taken the third dose, 44 less than the previous day.
 1.2 million doses of the Pfizer–BioNTech vaccine arrived in Indonesia.
 2 January
 63,545,184 specimens had been tested from 42,756,169 people using RT-PCR, TCM, and antigen rapid tests. There were 2,123 suspected cases.
 Indonesia confirmed 174 new cases, bringing the total number to 4,263,168. 190 patients recovered, bringing the number to 4,114,689. 1 patient deceased – the joint-lowest since 23 March 2020, bringing the tally to 144,097. 510 municipalities and regencies had reported at least one positive case.
 As of 18:00 WIB (UTC+7), 165,933,591 people had taken the first dose of vaccine while 114,109,198 had completed the process with the second dose. Oddly, there were 1,288,786 health professionals who had taken the third dose, 7 less than the previous day. From this day on, the government also counted the numbers of children aged 6 to 11 who had been jabbed.
 3 January
 63,829,597 specimens had been tested from 42,965,736 people using RT-PCR, TCM, and antigen rapid tests. There were 2,299 suspected cases.
 Indonesia confirmed 265 new cases, bringing the total number to 4,263,433. 112 patients recovered, bringing the number to 4,114,801. 5 patients deceased, bringing the tally to 144,102. 510 municipalities and regencies had reported at least one positive case.
 The number of active cases increased by 148, the highest since 3 August 2021.
 As of 18:00 WIB (UTC+7), 166,330,321 people had taken the first dose of vaccine while 114,293,480 had completed the process with the second dose. In addition, there were 1,288,839 health professionals who had taken the third dose.
 The Ministry of Health confirmed 16 new cases of the Omicron variant, bringing the total to 152.
 4 January
 64,137,224 specimens had been tested from 43,198,482 people using RT-PCR, TCM, and antigen rapid tests. There were 4,257 suspected cases.
 Indonesia confirmed 299 new cases, bringing the total number to 4,263,732. 168 patients recovered, bringing the number to 4,114,969. 3 patients deceased, bringing the tally to 144,105. 510 municipalities and regencies had reported at least one positive case.
 As of 18:00 WIB (UTC+7), 166,876,596 people had taken the first dose of vaccine while 114,689,041 had completed the process with the second dose. In addition, there were 1,295,326 health professionals who had taken the third dose.
 The government extended the community activities restrictions enforcement until 17 January.
 3.566 million doses of the Oxford–AstraZeneca vaccine arrived in Indonesia.
 The Ministry of Health confirmed 92 new cases of the Omicron variant, bringing the total to 254.
 5 January
 64,422,368 specimens had been tested from 43,415,786 people using RT-PCR, TCM, and antigen rapid tests. There were 4,964 suspected cases.
 Indonesia confirmed 404 new cases – the joint-highest since 26 November 2021, bringing the total number to 4,264,136. 180 patients recovered, bringing the number to 4,115,149. 3 patients deceased, bringing the tally to 144,109. 510 municipalities and regencies had reported at least one positive case.
 The number of active cases increased by 220, the highest since 3 August 2021.
 As of 18:00 WIB (UTC+7), 167,521,744 people had taken the first dose of vaccine while 115,080,563 had completed the process with the second dose. Oddly, there were 1,295,305 health professionals who had taken the third dose, 21 less than the previous day.
 6 January
 64,697,095 specimens had been tested from 43,624,574 people using RT-PCR, TCM, and antigen rapid tests. There were 5,088 suspected cases.
 Indonesia confirmed 533 new cases – the highest since 4 November 2021, bringing the total number to 4,264,669. 209 patients recovered, bringing the number to 4,115,358. 7 patients deceased, bringing the tally to 144,116. 510 municipalities and regencies had reported at least one positive case.
 The number of active cases increased by 317, the highest since 3 August 2021. It was the first time since 27 November 2021 that the number of active cases increased for four days in a row.
 As of 18:00 WIB (UTC+7), 168,327,349 people had taken the first dose of vaccine while 115,820,788 had completed the process with the second dose. In addition, there were 1,297,372 health professionals who had taken the third dose.
 7 January
 64,980,357 specimens had been tested from 43,823,061 people using RT-PCR, TCM, and antigen rapid tests. There were 4,898 suspected cases.
 Indonesia confirmed 518 new cases, bringing the total number to 4,265,187. 214 patients recovered, bringing the number to 4,115,572. 5 patients deceased, bringing the tally to 144,121. 510 municipalities and regencies had reported at least one positive case.
 It was the first time since 20 July 2021 that the number of active cases increased for five days in a row.
 As of 18:00 WIB (UTC+7), 169,077,096 people had taken the first dose of vaccine while 116,304,558 had completed the process with the second dose. Oddly, there were 1,297,309 health professionals who had taken the third dose, 63 less than the previous day.
 The Ministry of Health confirmed 57 new cases of the Omicron variant, bringing the total to 318. However, it should have been 311 if they calculated from the previous 254.
 Indonesia banned foreigners from 14 countries over Omicron fears, including South Africa, Botswana, Angola, Zambia, Zimbabwe, Malawi, Mozambique, Namibia, Eswatini, Lesotho, France, the United Kingdom, Denmark, and Norway.
 1.252 million doses of the Oxford–AstraZeneca vaccine arrived in Indonesia.
 8 January
 65,259,045 specimens had been tested from 44,000,762 people using RT-PCR, TCM, and antigen rapid tests. There were 5,646 suspected cases.
 Indonesia confirmed 479 new cases, bringing the total number to 4,265,666. 175 patients recovered, bringing the number to 4,115,747. 6 patients deceased, bringing the tally to 144,127. 510 municipalities and regencies had reported at least one positive case.
 It was the first time since 20 July 2021 that the number of active cases increased for six days in a row.
 As of 18:00 WIB (UTC+7), 169,781,466 people had taken the first dose of vaccine while 116,716,900 had completed the process with the second dose. In addition, there were 1,325,970 health professionals who had taken the third dose.
 3.182 million doses of the Oxford–AstraZeneca vaccine arrived in Indonesia.
 The Ministry of Health confirmed 75 new cases of the Omicron variant, bringing the total to 414. However, it should have been 393 if they calculated from the previous 318.
 9 January
 65,514,927 specimens had been tested from 44,177,975 people using RT-PCR, TCM, and antigen rapid tests. There were 4,013 suspected cases.
 Indonesia confirmed 529 new cases, bringing the total number to 4,266,195. 211 patients recovered, bringing the number to 4,115,958. 2 patients deceased, bringing the tally to 144,129. 510 municipalities and regencies had reported at least one positive case.
 It was the first time since 20 July 2021 that the number of active cases increased for seven days in a row.
 As of 18:00 WIB (UTC+7), 170,222,771 people had taken the first dose of vaccine while 116,821,837 had completed the process with the second dose. In addition, there were 1,326,404 health professionals who had taken the third dose.
 10 January
 65,774,472 specimens had been tested from 44,359,401 people using RT-PCR, TCM, and antigen rapid tests. There were 3,193 suspected cases.
 Indonesia confirmed 454 new cases, bringing the total number to 4,266,649. 244 patients recovered, bringing the number to 4,116,202. 7 patients deceased, bringing the tally to 144,136. 510 municipalities and regencies had reported at least one positive case.
 It was the first time since 20 July 2021 that the number of active cases increased for eight days in a row.
 As of 18:00 WIB (UTC+7), 170,715,883 people had taken the first dose of vaccine while 117,120,542 had completed the process with the second dose. In addition, there were 1,327,268 health professionals who had taken the third dose.
 The Ministry of Health confirmed 92 new cases of the Omicron variant, bringing the total to 506.
 11 January
 66,062,939 specimens had been tested from 44,563,107 people using RT-PCR, TCM, and antigen rapid tests. There were 5,045 suspected cases.
 Indonesia confirmed 802 new cases – the joint-highest since 20 October 2021, bringing the total number to 4,267,451. 446 patients recovered – the highest since 6 December 2021, bringing the number to 4,116,648. 8 patients deceased, bringing the tally to 144,144. 510 municipalities and regencies had reported at least one positive case.
 The number of active cases increased by 348, the highest since 3 August 2021. It was the first time since 20 July 2021 that the number of active cases increased for nine days in a row.
 As of 18:00 WIB (UTC+7), 171,441,249 people had taken the first dose of vaccine while 117,646,702 had completed the process with the second dose. In addition, there were 1,329,884 health professionals who had taken the third dose.
 1.847 million doses of the Oxford–AstraZeneca vaccine arrived in Indonesia.
 12 January
 66,336,745 specimens had been tested from 44,761,743 people using RT-PCR, TCM, and antigen rapid tests. There were 5,347 suspected cases.
 Indonesia confirmed 646 new cases, bringing the total number to 4,268,097. 314 patients recovered, bringing the number to 4,116,962. 6 patients deceased, bringing the tally to 144,150. 510 municipalities and regencies had reported at least one positive case.
 It was the first time since 20 July 2021 that the number of active cases increased for 10 days in a row.
 As of 18:00 WIB (UTC+7), 172,389,272 people had taken the first dose of vaccine while 118,134,002 had completed the process with the second dose. In addition, there were 1,331,670 health professionals who had taken the third dose.
 The Ministry of Health confirmed 66 new cases of the Omicron variant, bringing the total to 572.
 Indonesia started to inoculate the third or booster shots for general public using five vaccine brands.
 13 January
 66,615,011 specimens had been tested from 44,957,270 people using RT-PCR, TCM, and antigen rapid tests. There were 5,405 suspected cases.
 Indonesia confirmed 793 new cases, bringing the total number to 4,268,890. 385 patients recovered, bringing the number to 4,117,347. 5 patients deceased, bringing the tally to 144,155. 510 municipalities and regencies had reported at least one positive case.
 The number of active cases increased by 403, the highest since 3 August 2021. It was the first time since 20 July 2021 that the number of active cases increased for 11 days in a row.
 As of 18:00 WIB (UTC+7), 173,458,125 people had taken the first dose of vaccine while 118,620,965 had completed the process with the second dose. In addition, there were 1,334,041 health professionals who had taken the third dose.
 14 January
 66,895,574 specimens had been tested from 45,155,645 people using RT-PCR, TCM, and antigen rapid tests. There were 5,383 suspected cases.
 Indonesia confirmed 850 new cases – the highest since 20 October 2021, bringing the total number to 4,269,740. 353 patients recovered, bringing the number to 4,117,700. 8 patients deceased, bringing the tally to 144,163. 510 municipalities and regencies had reported at least one positive case.
 The number of active cases increased by 489, the highest since 3 August 2021. It was the first time since 20 July 2021 that the number of active cases increased for 12 days in a row.
 As of 18:00 WIB (UTC+7), 174,756,729 people had taken the first dose of vaccine while 119,187,857 had completed the process with the second dose. In addition, there were 1,337,169 health professionals who had taken the third dose.
 15 January
 67,173,430 specimens had been tested from 45,352,065 people using RT-PCR, TCM, and antigen rapid tests. There were 4,345 suspected cases.
 Indonesia confirmed 1,054 new cases – the highest since 13 October 2021, bringing the total number to 4,270,794. 464 patients recovered – the highest since 6 December 2021, bringing the number to 4,118,164. 4 patients deceased, bringing the tally to 144,167. 510 municipalities and regencies had reported at least one positive case.
 The number of active cases increased by 586, the highest since 3 August 2021. It was the first time since 20 July 2021 that the number of active cases increased for 13 days in a row.
 As of 18:00 WIB (UTC+7), 175,885,767 people had taken the first dose of vaccine while 119,547,188 had completed the process with the second dose. In addition, there were 1,338,865 health professionals who had taken the third dose.
 The Ministry of Health confirmed 176 new cases of the Omicron variant, bringing the total to 748.
 16 January
 67,424,918 specimens had been tested from 45,518,570 people using RT-PCR, TCM, and antigen rapid tests. There were 4,164 suspected cases.
 Indonesia confirmed 855 new cases, bringing the total number to 4,271,649. 710 patients recovered – the most since 6 December 2021, bringing the number to 4,118,874. 3 patients deceased, bringing the tally to 144,170. 510 municipalities and regencies had reported at least one positive case.
 It was the first time since 20 July 2021 that the number of active cases increased for 14 days in a row.
 As of 18:00 WIB (UTC+7), 176,361,313 people had taken the first dose of vaccine while 119,770,441 had completed the process with the second dose. In addition, there were 1,340,163 health professionals who had taken the third dose.
 896,000 doses of the Oxford–AstraZeneca vaccine and six million doses of CoronaVac arrived in Indonesia.
 17 January
 67,694,431 specimens had been tested from 45,696,853 people using RT-PCR, TCM, and antigen rapid tests. There were 3,069 suspected cases.
 Indonesia confirmed 772 new cases, bringing the total number to 4,272,421. 598 patients recovered, bringing the number to 4,119,472. 4 patients deceased, bringing the tally to 144,174. 510 municipalities and regencies had reported at least one positive case.
 It was the first time since 20 July 2021 that the number of active cases increased for 15 days in a row.
 As of 18:00 WIB (UTC+7), 176,897,010 people had taken the first dose of vaccine while 120,137,420 had completed the process with the second dose. In addition, there were 1,341,830 health professionals who had taken the third dose.
 Five million doses of CoronaVac arrived in Indonesia.
 18 January
 67,973,358 specimens had been tested from 45,891,161 people using RT-PCR, TCM, and antigen rapid tests. There were 5,132 suspected cases.
 Indonesia confirmed 1,362 new cases – the most since 8 October 2021, bringing the total number to 4,273,783. 564 patients recovered, bringing the number to 4,120,036. 9 patients deceased – the most since 29 December 2021, bringing the tally to 144,183. 510 municipalities and regencies had reported at least one positive case.
 The number of active cases increased by 789, the highest since 3 August 2021. It was the first time since 20 July 2021 that the number of active cases increased for 16 days in a row.
 As of 18:00 WIB (UTC+7), 177,639,097 people had taken the first dose of vaccine while 121,071,962 had completed the process with the second dose. In addition, there were 1,345,362 health professionals who had taken the third dose.
 1.4 million doses of the Oxford–AstraZeneca vaccine arrived in Indonesia.
 The government extended the community activities restrictions enforcement until 24 January.
 19 January
 68,201,218 specimens had been tested from 46,043,177 people using RT-PCR, TCM, and antigen rapid tests. There were 5,814 suspected cases.
 Indonesia confirmed 1,745 new cases – the most since 29 September 2021, bringing the total number to 4,275,528. 504 patients recovered, bringing the number to 4,120,540. 9 patients deceased – the joint-highest since 29 December 2021, bringing the tally to 144,192. 510 municipalities and regencies had reported at least one positive case.
 The number of active cases increased by 1,232, the highest since 28 July 2021, and reached 10 thousand mark for the first time since 7 November 2021. It was the first time since 20 July 2021 that the number of active cases increased for 17 days in a row.
 As of 18:00 WIB (UTC+7), 178,622,323 people had taken the first dose of vaccine while 121,918,984 had completed the process with the second dose. In addition, there were 1,345,362 health professionals who had taken the third dose.
 651,130 doses of the Oxford–AstraZeneca vaccine arrived in Indonesia.
 20 January
 68,527,332 specimens had been tested from 46,226,708 people using RT-PCR, TCM, and antigen rapid tests. There were 5,346 suspected cases.
 Indonesia confirmed 2,116 new cases – the most since 25 September 2021, bringing the total number to 4,277,644. 577 patients recovered, bringing the number to 4,121,117. 7 patients deceased, bringing the tally to 144,199. 510 municipalities and regencies had reported at least one positive case.
 The number of active cases increased by 1,532, the highest since 28 July 2021. It was the first time since 20 July 2021 that the number of active cases increased for 18 days in a row.
 As of 18:00 WIB (UTC+7), 179,395,618 people had taken the first dose of vaccine while 122,621,745 had completed the process with the second dose. In addition, there were 1,355,257 health professionals who had taken the third dose.
 21 January
 68,819,737 specimens had been tested from 46,426,888 people using RT-PCR, TCM, and antigen rapid tests. There were 5,896 suspected cases.
 Indonesia confirmed 2,604 new cases – the most since 23 September 2021, bringing the total number to 4,280,248. 811 patients recovered  – the most since 6 December 2021, bringing the number to 4,121,928. 2 patients deceased, bringing the tally to 144,201. 510 municipalities and regencies had reported at least one positive case.
 The number of active cases increased by 1,791, the highest since 28 July 2021. It was the first time since 20 July 2021 that the number of active cases increased for 19 days in a row.
 As of 18:00 WIB (UTC+7), 180,236,178 people had taken the first dose of vaccine while 123,373,451 had completed the process with the second dose. In addition, there were 1,358,753 health professionals who had taken the third dose.
 22 January
 69,100,898 specimens had been tested from 46,621,388 people using RT-PCR, TCM, and antigen rapid tests. There were 7,612 suspected cases.
 Indonesia confirmed 3,205 new cases – the most since 21 September 2021, bringing the total number to 4,283,453. 627 patients recovered, bringing the number to 4,122,555. 5 patients deceased, bringing the tally to 144,206. 510 municipalities and regencies had reported at least one positive case.
 The number of active cases increased by 2,573, the highest since 24 July 2021. It was the first time since 20 July 2021 that the number of active cases increased for 20 days in a row.
 As of 18:00 WIB (UTC+7), 180,965,282 people had taken the first dose of vaccine while 123,965,881 had completed the process with the second dose. In addition, there were 1,363,504 health professionals who had taken the third dose.
 1.257 million doses of the Pfizer–BioNTech vaccine arrived in Indonesia.
 Indonesia confirmed the first two deaths from the Omicron variant. As of this date, the country had confirmed 1,161 Omicron cases, 831 of which were from abroad.
 23 January
 69,352,805 specimens had been tested from 46,785,214 people using RT-PCR, TCM, and antigen rapid tests. There were 4,470 suspected cases.
 Indonesia confirmed 2,925 new cases, bringing the total number to 4,286,378. 712 patients recovered, bringing the number to 4,123,267. 14 patients deceased – the most since 8 December 2021, bringing the tally to 144,220. 510 municipalities and regencies had reported at least one positive case.
 It was the first time since 20 July 2021 that the number of active cases increased for 21 days in a row.
 As of 18:00 WIB (UTC+7), 181,172,668 people had taken the first dose of vaccine while 124,098,145 had completed the process with the second dose. In addition, there were 1,366,066 health professionals who had taken the third dose.
 24 January
 69,611,597 specimens had been tested from 46,960,977 people using RT-PCR, TCM, and antigen rapid tests. There were 5,032 suspected cases.
 Indonesia confirmed 2,927 new cases, bringing the total number to 4,289,305. 944 patients recovered – the most since 6 December 2021, bringing the number to 4,124,211. 7 patients deceased, bringing the tally to 144,227. 510 municipalities and regencies had reported at least one positive case.
 It was the first time since 20 July 2021 that the number of active cases increased for 22 days in a row.
 As of 18:00 WIB (UTC+7), 181,650,255 people had taken the first dose of vaccine while 124,633,041 had completed the process with the second dose. In addition, there were 1,368,581 health professionals who had taken the third dose.
 25 January
 69,871,272 specimens had been tested from 47,137,384 people using RT-PCR, TCM, and antigen rapid tests. There were 7,483 suspected cases.
 Indonesia confirmed 4,878 new cases – the most since 11 September 2021, bringing the total number to 4,294,183. 869 patients recovered, bringing the number to 4,125,080. 20 patients deceased – the joint-highest since 12 November 2021, bringing the tally to 144,247. 510 municipalities and regencies had reported at least one positive case.
 The number of active cases increased by 3,989, the highest since 24 July 2021. It was the first time since 20 July 2021 that the number of active cases increased for 23 days in a row.
 As of 18:00 WIB (UTC+7), 182,274,616 people had taken the first dose of vaccine while 125,421,699 had completed the process with the second dose. In addition, there were 1,374,153 health professionals who had taken the third dose.
 The government extended the community activities restrictions enforcement until 31 January.
 26 January
 70,220,313 specimens had been tested from 47,381,797 people using RT-PCR, TCM, and antigen rapid tests. There were 8,849 suspected cases.
 Indonesia confirmed 7,010 new cases – the most since 7 September 2021, bringing the total number to 4,301,193. 2,582 patients recovered – the most since 8 October 2021, bringing the number to 4,127,662. 7 patients deceased, bringing the tally to 144,254. 510 municipalities and regencies had reported at least one positive case.
 The number of active cases increased by 4,421, the highest since 23 July 2021. It was the first time since 20 July 2021 that the number of active cases increased for 24 days in a row.
 As of 18:00 WIB (UTC+7), 182,857,206 people had taken the first dose of vaccine while 126,168,881 had completed the process with the second dose. In addition, there were 1,376,687 health professionals who had taken the third dose.
 27 January
 70,567,046 specimens had been tested from 47,618,448 people using RT-PCR, TCM, and antigen rapid tests. There were 9,820 suspected cases.
 Indonesia confirmed 8,077 new cases – the most since 2 September 2021, bringing the total number to 4,309,270. 1,643 patients recovered, bringing the number to 4,129,305. 7 patients deceased, bringing the tally to 144,261. 510 municipalities and regencies had reported at least one positive case.
 The number of active cases increased by 6,427, the highest since 23 July 2021. It was the first time since 20 July 2021 that the number of active cases increased for 25 days in a row.
 As of 18:00 WIB (UTC+7), 183,418,981 people had taken the first dose of vaccine while 126,868,084 had completed the process with the second dose. In addition, there were 1,383,198 health professionals who had taken the third dose.
 28 January
 70,939,930 specimens had been tested from 47,876,593 people using RT-PCR, TCM, and antigen rapid tests. There were 10,043 suspected cases.
 Indonesia confirmed 9,905 new cases – the most since 1 September 2021, bringing the total number to 4,319,175. 2,028 patients recovered, bringing the number to 4,131,333. 7 patients deceased, bringing the tally to 144,268. 510 municipalities and regencies had reported at least one positive case.
 The number of active cases increased by 7,870, the highest since 23 July 2021. It was the first time since 20 July 2021 that the number of active cases increased for 26 days in a row.
 As of 18:00 WIB (UTC+7), 183,907,356 people had taken the first dose of vaccine while 127,449,884 had completed the process with the second dose. In addition, there were 1,384,467 health professionals who had taken the third dose.
 2.968 million doses of the Oxford–AstraZeneca vaccine arrived in Indonesia.
 As of this date, Indonesia had confirmed 1,988 Omicron cases.
 29 January
 71,323,331 specimens had been tested from 48,137,643 people using RT-PCR, TCM, and antigen rapid tests. There were 11,112 suspected cases.
 Indonesia confirmed 11,588 new cases – the most since 27 August 2021, bringing the total number to 4,330,763. 2,590 patients recovered – the most since 8 October 2021, bringing the number to 4,133,923. 17 patients deceased, bringing the tally to 144,285. 510 municipalities and regencies had reported at least one positive case.
 The number of active cases increased by 8,981, the highest since 22 July 2021. It was the first time since 20 July 2021 that the number of active cases increased for 27 days in a row.
 As of 18:00 WIB (UTC+7), 184,406,276 people had taken the first dose of vaccine while 127,911,244 had completed the process with the second dose. In addition, there were 1,389,209 health professionals who had taken the third dose.
 30 January
 71,637,728 specimens had been tested from 48,343,446 people using RT-PCR, TCM, and antigen rapid tests. There were 7,598 suspected cases.
 Indonesia confirmed 12,422 new cases – the most since 27 August 2021, bringing the total number to 4,343,185. 3,241 patients recovered – the most since 8 October 2021, bringing the number to 4,137,164. 18 patients deceased, bringing the tally to 144,303. 510 municipalities and regencies had reported at least one positive case.
 The number of active cases increased by 9,163, the highest since 22 July 2021. It was the first time since 20 July 2021 that the number of active cases increased for 28 days in a row.
 As of 18:00 WIB (UTC+7), 184,589,929 people had taken the first dose of vaccine, 128,004,957 had completed the second dose, and 4,208,808 had been inoculated with the third dose.
 31 January
 71,953,778 specimens had been tested from 48,545,839 people using RT-PCR, TCM, and antigen rapid tests. There were 8,675 suspected cases.
 Indonesia confirmed 10,185 new cases, bringing the total number to 4,353,370. 3,290 patients recovered – the most since 8 October 2021, bringing the number to 4,140,454. 17 patients deceased, bringing the tally to 144,320. 510 municipalities and regencies had reported at least one positive case.
 It was the first time since 20 July 2021 that the number of active cases increased for 29 days in a row.
 As of 18:00 WIB (UTC+7), 184,931,413 people had taken the first dose of vaccine, 128,396,864 had completed the second dose, and 4,417,111 had been inoculated with the third dose.
 The government extended the community activities restrictions enforcement until 7 February in Java and Bali and 14 February in the rest of the country.

February
 1 February
 72,331,366 specimens had been tested from 48,781,744 people using RT-PCR, TCM, and antigen rapid tests. There were 12,121 suspected cases.
 Indonesia confirmed 16,021 new cases – the most since 26 August 2021, bringing the total number to 4,369,391. 3,240 patients recovered, bringing the number to 4,143,694. 28 patients deceased – the highest since 2 November 2021, bringing the tally to 144,348. 510 municipalities and regencies had reported at least one positive case.
 The number of active cases increased by 12,753, the highest since 18 July 2021. It was the first time since 20 July 2021 that the number of active cases increased for 30 days in a row.
 As of 18:00 WIB (UTC+7), 185,153,907 people had taken the first dose of vaccine, 128,673,040 had completed the second dose, and 4,514,932 had been inoculated with the third dose.
 2 February
 72,685,557 specimens had been tested from 49,008,702 people using RT-PCR, TCM, and antigen rapid tests. There were 12,482 suspected cases.
 Indonesia confirmed 17,895 new cases – the most since 26 August 2021, bringing the total number to 4,387,286. 5,110 patients recovered – the most since 22 September 2021, bringing the number to 4,148,804. 25 patients deceased, bringing the tally to 144,373. All 514 municipalities and regencies had reported at least one positive case.
 The number of active cases increased by 12,760, the highest since 18 July 2021. It was the first time since 20 July 2021 that the number of active cases increased for 31 days in a row.
 As of 18:00 WIB (UTC+7), 185,477,036 people had taken the first dose of vaccine, 129,156,255 had completed the second dose, and 4,700,473 had been inoculated with the third dose.
 3 February
 73,158,699 specimens had been tested from 49,316,689 people using RT-PCR, TCM, and antigen rapid tests; in the previous 24 hours, a record-breaking 473,142 tests were conducted to 307,987 people – another record-breaker. There were 18,955 suspected cases.
 Indonesia confirmed 27,197 new cases – the most since 14 August 2021, bringing the total number to 4,414,483. 5,993 patients recovered – the most since 21 September 2021, bringing the number to 4,154,797. 38 patients deceased – the highest since 21 October 2021, bringing the tally to 144,411. All 514 municipalities and regencies had reported at least one positive case.
 The number of active cases increased by 21,166, the highest since 17 July 2021. It was the first time since 20 July 2021 that the number of active cases increased for 32 days in a row. The number reached 100 thousand mark for the first time since 12 September 2021.
 As of 18:00 WIB (UTC+7), 185,804,724 people had taken the first dose of vaccine, 129,768,642 had completed the second dose, and 4,959,215 had been inoculated with the third dose.
 4 February
 73,639,619 specimens had been tested from 49,629,666 people using RT-PCR, TCM, and antigen rapid tests; in the previous 24 hours, a record-breaking 480,920 tests were conducted to 312,977 people – another record-breaker. There were 22,008 suspected cases.
 Indonesia confirmed 32,211 new cases – the most since 6 August 2021, bringing the total number to 4,446,694. 7,190 patients recovered – the most since 17 September 2021, bringing the number to 4,161,987. 42 patients deceased – the highest since 21 October 2021, bringing the tally to 144,453. All 514 municipalities and regencies had reported at least one positive case.
 The number of active cases increased by 24,979, the highest since 15 July 2021. It was the first time since 20 July 2021 that the number of active cases increased for 33 days in a row.
 As of 18:00 WIB (UTC+7), 186,200,107 people had taken the first dose of vaccine, 130,458,684 had completed the second dose, and 5,298,120 had been inoculated with the third dose.
 5 February
 74,114,653 specimens had been tested from 49,935,908 people using RT-PCR, TCM, and antigen rapid tests. There were 21,404 suspected cases.
 Indonesia confirmed 33,729 new cases – the most since 6 August 2021, bringing the total number to 4,480,423. 10,471 patients recovered – the most since 16 September 2021, bringing the number to 4,172,458. 44 patients deceased – the highest since 19 October 2021, bringing the tally to 144,497. All 514 municipalities and regencies had reported at least one positive case.
 It was the first time since 20 July 2021 that the number of active cases increased for 34 days in a row.
 As of 18:00 WIB (UTC+7), 186,484,566 people had taken the first dose of vaccine, 130,950,096 had completed the second dose, and 5,506,528 had been inoculated with the third dose.
 6 February
 74,586,157 specimens had been tested from 50,201,467 people using RT-PCR, TCM, and antigen rapid tests. There were 17,422 suspected cases.
 Indonesia confirmed 36,057 new cases – the most since 6 August 2021, bringing the total number to 4,516,480. 10,569 patients recovered – the most since 16 September 2021, bringing the number to 4,183,027. 57 patients deceased – the highest since 11 October 2021, bringing the tally to 144,554. All 514 municipalities and regencies had reported at least one positive case.
 The number of active cases increased by 25,431, the highest since 15 July 2021. It was the first time since 20 July 2021 that the number of active cases increased for 35 days in a row.
 As of 18:00 WIB (UTC+7), 186,603,189 people had taken the first dose of vaccine, 131,083,682 had completed the second dose, and 5,540,497 had been inoculated with the third dose.
 Jakarta broke its own record set on 12 July 2021 by reporting 15,825 cases in the last 24 hours, the highest daily new cases by a province.
 7 February
 74,825,668 specimens had been tested from 50,382,434 people using RT-PCR, TCM, and antigen rapid tests. There were 10,234 suspected cases.
 Indonesia confirmed 26,121 new cases, bringing the total number to 4,542,601. 8,577 patients recovered, bringing the number to 4,191,604. 82 patients deceased – the highest since 4 October 2021, bringing the tally to 144,636. All 514 municipalities and regencies had reported at least one positive case.
 It was the first time since 20 July 2021 that the number of active cases increased for 36 days in a row.
 As of 18:00 WIB (UTC+7), 186,866,025 people had taken the first dose of vaccine, 131,536,971 had completed the second dose, and 5,679,359 had been inoculated with the third dose.
 8 February
 75,280,587 specimens had been tested from 50,667,072 people using RT-PCR, TCM, and antigen rapid tests. There were 19,992 suspected cases.
 Indonesia confirmed 37,492 new cases – the most since 6 August 2021, bringing the total number to 4,580,093. 10,708 patients recovered – the most since 16 September 2021, bringing the number to 4,202,312. 83 patients deceased – the highest since 4 October 2021, bringing the tally to 144,719. All 514 municipalities and regencies had reported at least one positive case.
 The number of active cases increased by 26,701, the highest since 15 July 2021. It was the first time since 20 July 2021 that the number of active cases increased for 37 days in a row.
 As of 18:00 WIB (UTC+7), 187,157,254 people had taken the first dose of vaccine, 132,386,962 had completed the second dose, and 5,959,528 had been inoculated with the third dose.
 Jakarta became the first province to pass one million cumulative cases.
 The government extended the community activities restrictions enforcement until 14 February in Java and Bali.
 As of this date, Indonesia had confirmed 3,779 Omicron cases.
 9 February
 75,685,093 specimens had been tested from 50,912,897 people using RT-PCR, TCM, and antigen rapid tests. There were 23,512 suspected cases.
 Indonesia confirmed 46,843 new cases – the most since 28 July 2021, bringing the total number to 4,626,936. 14,016 patients recovered – the most since 16 September 2021, bringing the number to 4,216,328. 65 patients deceased, bringing the tally to 144,784. All 514 municipalities and regencies had reported at least one positive case.
 The number of active cases increased by 32,762, the highest since 15 July 2021. It was the first time since 20 July 2021 that the number of active cases increased for 38 days in a row.
 As of 18:00 WIB (UTC+7), 187,488,609 people had taken the first dose of vaccine, 133,229,408 had completed the second dose, and 6,221,863 had been inoculated with the third dose.
 2.7 million doses of the Oxford–AstraZeneca vaccine arrived in Indonesia. With this shipment, the number of vaccine doses received by Indonesia crossed a milestone of 500 million.
 10 February
 76,071,156 specimens had been tested from 51,151,585 people using RT-PCR, TCM, and antigen rapid tests. There were 23,051 suspected cases.
 Indonesia confirmed 40,618 new cases, bringing the total number to 4,667,554. 18,182 patients recovered – the most since 2 September 2021, bringing the number to 4,234,510. 74 patients deceased, bringing the tally to 144,858. All 514 municipalities and regencies had reported at least one positive case.
 It was the first time since 20 July 2021 that the number of active cases increased for 39 days in a row.
 As of 18:00 WIB (UTC+7), 187,806,589 people had taken the first dose of vaccine, 134,024,120 had completed the second dose, and 6,481,633 had been inoculated with the third dose.
 11 February
 76,434,721 specimens had been tested from 51,378,087 people using RT-PCR, TCM, and antigen rapid tests. There were 18,947 suspected cases.
 Indonesia confirmed 40,489 new cases, bringing the total number to 4,708,043. 15,767 patients recovered, bringing the number to 4,250,277. 100 patients deceased – the highest since 30 September 2021, bringing the tally to 144,958. All 514 municipalities and regencies had reported at least one positive case.
 It was the first time since 20 July 2021 that the number of active cases increased for 40 days in a row.
 As of 18:00 WIB (UTC+7), 187,930,340 people had taken the first dose of vaccine, 134,737,877 had completed the second dose, and 6,752,373 had been inoculated with the third dose.
 12 February
 76,964,762 specimens had been tested from 51,699,232 people using RT-PCR, TCM, and antigen rapid tests; in the previous 24 hours, a record-breaking 530,041 tests were conducted to 321,145 people – another record-breaker. There were 30,604 suspected cases.
 Indonesia confirmed 55,209 new cases – the most since 15 July 2021 and the second-most ever, bringing the total number to 4,763,252. 32,570 patients recovered – the most since 25 August 2021, bringing the number to 4,282,847. 107 patients deceased – the highest since 30 September 2021, bringing the tally to 145,065. All 514 municipalities and regencies had reported at least one positive case.
 It was the first time since 20 July 2021 that the number of active cases increased for 41 days in a row.
 As of 18:00 WIB (UTC+7), 188,168,577 people had taken the first dose of vaccine, 135,543,977 had completed the second dose, and 7,001,734 had been inoculated with the third dose.
 13 February
 77,415,802 specimens had been tested from 51,971,725 people using RT-PCR, TCM, and antigen rapid tests. There were 23,218 suspected cases.
 Indonesia confirmed 44,526 new cases, bringing the total number to 4,807,778. 26,916 patients recovered, bringing the number to 4,309,763. 111 patients deceased – the highest since 30 September 2021, bringing the tally to 145,176. All 514 municipalities and regencies had reported at least one positive case.
 It was the first time since 20 July 2021 that the number of active cases increased for 42 days in a row.
 As of 18:00 WIB (UTC+7), 188,289,107 people had taken the first dose of vaccine, 135,773,852 had completed the second dose, and 7,053,881 had been inoculated with the third dose.
 The Ministry of Health required those who missed to be inoculated with the second dose six months after the first dose to restart the vaccination process again. Additionally, those that lapsed no longer than six months are eligible to receive the second dose. In both cases, vaccination with other brand is possible depends on the expiration date of the vaccine. The policy was initiated to tackle the slow second dose vaccination rate, with 2.5 million people being only vaccinated once after six months.
 14 February
 77,856,000 specimens had been tested from 52,245,639 people using RT-PCR, TCM, and antigen rapid tests. There were 22,227 suspected cases.
 Indonesia confirmed 36,501 new cases, bringing the total number to 4,844,279. 13,338 patients recovered, bringing the number to 4,323,101. 145 patients deceased – the highest since 23 September 2021, bringing the tally to 145,321. All 514 municipalities and regencies had reported at least one positive case.
 It was the first time since 20 July 2021 that the number of active cases increased for 43 days in a row.
 As of 18:00 WIB (UTC+7), 188,494,031 people had taken the first dose of vaccine, 136,378,660 had completed the second dose, and 7,224,137 had been inoculated with the third dose.
 15 February
 78,438,828 specimens had been tested from 52,603,909 people using RT-PCR, TCM, and antigen rapid tests; in the previous 24 hours, a record-breaking 582,828 tests were conducted to 358,270 people – another record-breaker. There were 35,594 suspected cases.
 Indonesia confirmed 57,049 new cases – breaking the all-time record of most daily cases ever set on 15 July 2021, bringing the total number to 4,901,328. 26,747 patients recovered, bringing the number to 4,349,848. 134 patients deceased, bringing the tally to 145,455. All 514 municipalities and regencies had reported at least one positive case.
 It was the first time since 20 July 2021 that the number of active cases increased for 44 days in a row.
 As of 18:00 WIB (UTC+7), 188,727,930 people had taken the first dose of vaccine, 137,154,728 had completed the second dose, and 7,421,408 had been inoculated with the third dose.
 The government extended the community activities restrictions enforcement until 21 February in Java and Bali and 28 February in the rest of the country.
 16 February
 79,004,878 specimens had been tested from 52,951,989 people using RT-PCR, TCM, and antigen rapid tests. There were 39,465 suspected cases.
 Indonesia confirmed 64,718 new cases – surpassing the all-time record set on the previous day, bringing the total number to 4,966,046. 25,386 patients recovered, bringing the number to 4,375,234. 167 patients deceased – the highest since 21 September 2021, bringing the tally to 145,622. All 514 municipalities and regencies had reported at least one positive case.
 The number of active cases increased by 39,165, breaking the record for most ever set on 15 July 2021. It was the first time since 20 July 2021 that the number of active cases increased for 45 days in a row.
 As of 18:00 WIB (UTC+7), 188,965,567 people had taken the first dose of vaccine, 138,011,691 had completed the second dose, and 7,677,161 had been inoculated with the third dose.
 17 February
 79,577,733 specimens had been tested from 53,296,382 people using RT-PCR, TCM, and antigen rapid tests. There were 41,237 suspected cases.
 Indonesia confirmed 63,956 new cases, bringing the total number to 5,030,002. 39,072 patients recovered – the most since 13 August 2021, bringing the number to 4,414,306. 206 patients deceased – the highest since 17 September 2021, bringing the tally to 145,828. All 514 municipalities and regencies had reported at least one positive case.
 It was the first time since 20 July 2021 and the third time ever that the number of active cases increased for 46 days in a row.
 As of 18:00 WIB (UTC+7), 189,205,609 people had taken the first dose of vaccine, 138,841,120 had completed the second dose, and 7,932,444 had been inoculated with the third dose.
 Indonesia became the first country in Southeast Asia, fourth in Asia, and 17th in the world to pass five million confirmed cases.
 West Java broke Jakarta's record set on 6 February 2022 by reporting 16,251 cases in the last 24 hours, the highest daily new cases by a province.
 18 February
 80,079,360 specimens had been tested from 53,603,989 people using RT-PCR, TCM, and antigen rapid tests. There were 42,632 suspected cases.
 Indonesia confirmed 59,635 new cases, bringing the total number to 5,089,637. 32,904 patients recovered, bringing the number to 4,447,210. 216 patients deceased – the highest since 17 September 2021, bringing the tally to 146,044. All 514 municipalities and regencies had reported at least one positive case.
 It was the first time since 29 May 2020 and the second time ever that the number of active cases increased for 47 days in a row.
 As of 18:00 WIB (UTC+7), 189,409,923 people had taken the first dose of vaccine, 139,606,794 had completed the second dose, and 8,215,374 had been inoculated with the third dose.
 19 February
 80,569,140 specimens had been tested from 53,913,144 people using RT-PCR, TCM, and antigen rapid tests. There were 36,710 suspected cases.
 Indonesia confirmed 59,384 new cases, bringing the total number to 5,149,021. 34,699 patients recovered, bringing the number to 4,481,909. 158 patients deceased, bringing the tally to 146,202. All 514 municipalities and regencies had reported at least one positive case.
 It was the first time since 29 May 2020 and the second time ever that the number of active cases increased for 48 days in a row.
 As of 18:00 WIB (UTC+7), 189,585,217 people had taken the first dose of vaccine, 140,174,704 had completed the second dose, and 8,424,999 had been inoculated with the third dose.
 20 February
 81,003,675 specimens had been tested from 54,178,913 people using RT-PCR, TCM, and antigen rapid tests. There were 24,900 suspected cases.
 Indonesia confirmed 48,484 new cases, bringing the total number to 5,197,505. 32,873 patients recovered, bringing the number to 4,514,782. 163 patients deceased, bringing the tally to 146,365. All 514 municipalities and regencies had reported at least one positive case.
 It was the first time since 29 May 2020 and the second time ever that the number of active cases increased for 49 days in a row.
 As of 18:00 WIB (UTC+7), 189,653,197 people had taken the first dose of vaccine, 140,306,573 had completed the second dose, and 8,458,902 had been inoculated with the third dose.
 21 February
 81,396,235 specimens had been tested from 54,422,139 people using RT-PCR, TCM, and antigen rapid tests. There were 17,996 suspected cases.
 Indonesia confirmed 34,418 new cases, bringing the total number to 5,231,923. 39,929 patients recovered – the most since 13 August 2021, bringing the number to 4,554,711. 176 patients deceased, bringing the tally to 146,541. All 514 municipalities and regencies had reported at least one positive case.
 The number of active cases decreased for the first time since 2 January 2022.
 As of 18:00 WIB (UTC+7), 189,810,164 people had taken the first dose of vaccine, 140,861,697 had completed the second dose, and 8,670,135 had been inoculated with the third dose.
 22 February
 81,933,316 specimens had been tested from 54,748,561 people using RT-PCR, TCM, and antigen rapid tests. There were 45,398 suspected cases.
 Indonesia confirmed 57,491 new cases, bringing the total number to 5,289,414. 38,474 patients recovered, bringing the number to 4,554,711. 257 patients deceased – the highest since 15 September 2021, bringing the tally to 146,798. All 514 municipalities and regencies had reported at least one positive case.
 As of 18:00 WIB (UTC+7), 189,969,875 people had taken the first dose of vaccine, 141,363,805 had completed the second dose, and 8,839,775 had been inoculated with the third dose.
 The government extended the community activities restrictions enforcement until 28 February in Java and Bali.
 23 February
 82,452,848 specimens had been tested from 55,058,049 people using RT-PCR, TCM, and antigen rapid tests. There were 36,258 suspected cases.
 Indonesia confirmed 61,488 new cases, bringing the total number to 5,350,902. 39,170 patients recovered, bringing the number to 4,632,355. 227 patients deceased, bringing the tally to 147,025. All 514 municipalities and regencies had reported at least one positive case.
 As of 18:00 WIB (UTC+7), 190,222,795 people had taken the first dose of vaccine, 142,265,542 had completed the second dose, and 9,166,612 had been inoculated with the third dose.
 24 February
 82,958,238 specimens had been tested from 55,346,076 people using RT-PCR, TCM, and antigen rapid tests. There were 35,701 suspected cases.
 Indonesia confirmed 57,426 new cases, bringing the total number to 5,408,328. 42,518 patients recovered – the most since 9 August 2021, bringing the number to 4,674,873. 317 patients deceased – the highest since 9 September 2021, bringing the tally to 147,342. All 514 municipalities and regencies had reported at least one positive case.
 As of 18:00 WIB (UTC+7), 190,445,824 people had taken the first dose of vaccine, 143,027,869 had completed the second dose, and 9,460,654 had been inoculated with the third dose.
 There were 586,113 active cases per this day, the highest ever.
 25 February
 83,442,770 specimens had been tested from 55,621,829 people using RT-PCR, TCM, and antigen rapid tests. There were 31,895 suspected cases.
 Indonesia confirmed 49,447 new cases, bringing the total number to 5,457,775. 61,361 patients recovered – breaking the all-time record for most daily recoveries set on 6 August 2021, bringing the number to 4,736,234. 244 patients deceased, bringing the tally to 147,586. All 514 municipalities and regencies had reported at least one positive case.
 As of 18:00 WIB (UTC+7), 190,590,633 people had taken the first dose of vaccine, 143,523,225 had completed the second dose, and 9,676,829 had been inoculated with the third dose.
 There were a decrease of active cases by 12,158, the most since 2 September 2021.
 Banten recorded 22,667 recoveries in the last 24 hours, the highest by a single province. It broke the previous record held by Jakarta with 20,602 recoveries.
 26 February
 83,933,900 specimens had been tested from 55,915,015 people using RT-PCR, TCM, and antigen rapid tests. There were 36,030 suspected cases.
 Indonesia confirmed 46,643 new cases, bringing the total number to 5,504,418. 41,805 patients recovered, bringing the number to 4,778,039. 258 patients deceased, bringing the tally to 147,844. All 514 municipalities and regencies had reported at least one positive case.
 As of 18:00 WIB (UTC+7), 190,666,869 people had taken the first dose of vaccine, 143,770,063 had completed the second dose, and 9,809,256 had been inoculated with the third dose.
 The government changed the gap between the second dose and the third dose of the vaccine from a minimum time of six months to three months for general public all ages. Previously, on 21 February, they only allowed it for elderlies.
 27 February
 84,304,512 specimens had been tested from 56,109,746 people using RT-PCR, TCM, and antigen rapid tests. There were 18,673 suspected cases.
 Indonesia confirmed 34,976 new cases, bringing the total number to 5,539,394. 39,384 patients recovered, bringing the number to 4,817,423. 229 patients deceased, bringing the tally to 148,073. All 514 municipalities and regencies had reported at least one positive case.
 As of 18:00 WIB (UTC+7), 190,667,112 people had taken the first dose of vaccine, 143,773,911 had completed the second dose, and 9,809,452 had been inoculated with the third dose.
 28 February
 84,580,727 specimens had been tested from 56,247,315 people using RT-PCR, TCM, and antigen rapid tests. There were 12,782 suspected cases.
 Indonesia confirmed 25,054 new cases, bringing the total number to 5,564,448. 43,992 patients recovered, bringing the number to 4,861,415. 262 patients deceased, bringing the tally to 148,335. All 514 municipalities and regencies had reported at least one positive case.
 As of 18:00 WIB (UTC+7), 190,969,599 people had taken the first dose of vaccine, 144,458,756 had completed the second dose, and 10,187,505 had been inoculated with the third dose.
 There were a decrease of active cases by 19,200, the most since 9 August 2021.
 The government extended the community activities restrictions enforcement until 7 March in Java and Bali and 14 March in the rest of the country.

March
 1 March
 85,019,478 specimens had been tested from 56,449,320 people using RT-PCR, TCM, and antigen rapid tests. There were 23,843 suspected cases.
 Indonesia confirmed 24,728 new cases, bringing the total number to 5,589,176. 39,887 patients recovered, bringing the number to 4,901,302. 325 patients deceased – the highest since 9 September 2021, bringing the tally to 148,660. All 514 municipalities and regencies had reported at least one positive case.
 As of 18:00 WIB (UTC+7), 190,976,812 people had taken the first dose of vaccine, 144,505,916 had completed the second dose, and 10,214,781 had been inoculated with the third dose.
 2 March
 85,620,930 specimens had been tested from 56,709,394 people using RT-PCR, TCM, and antigen rapid tests; in the previous 24 hours, a record-breaking 601,452 tests were conducted. There were 32,219 suspected cases.
 Indonesia confirmed 40,920 new cases, bringing the total number to 5,630,096. 42,935 patients recovered, bringing the number to 4,944,237. 376 patients deceased – the highest since 8 September 2021, bringing the tally to 149,036. All 514 municipalities and regencies had reported at least one positive case.
 As of 18:00 WIB (UTC+7), 190,979,617 people had taken the first dose of vaccine, 144,565,851 had completed the second dose, and 10,249,631 had been inoculated with the third dose.
 3 March
 86,008,226 specimens had been tested from 56,923,159 people using RT-PCR, TCM, and antigen rapid tests. There were 23,198 suspected cases.
 Indonesia confirmed 37,259 new cases, bringing the total number to 5,667,355. 42,154 patients recovered, bringing the number to 4,986,391. 232 patients deceased, bringing the tally to 149,268. All 514 municipalities and regencies had reported at least one positive case.
 As of 18:00 WIB (UTC+7), 191,136,293 people had taken the first dose of vaccine, 146,305,253 had completed the second dose, and 11,390,310 had been inoculated with the third dose.
 4 March
 86,349,857 specimens had been tested from 57,117,140 people using RT-PCR, TCM, and antigen rapid tests. There were 21,285 suspected cases.
 Indonesia confirmed 26,347 new cases, bringing the total number to 5,693,702. 40,462 patients recovered, bringing the number to 5,026,853. 328 patients deceased, bringing the tally to 149,596. All 514 municipalities and regencies had reported at least one positive case.
 As of 18:00 WIB (UTC+7), 191,632,138 people had taken the first dose of vaccine, 146,577,179 had completed the second dose, and 11,466,458 had been inoculated with the third dose.
 3.5 million doses of the Pfizer–BioNTech vaccine arrived in Indonesia.
 5 March
 86,750,007 specimens had been tested from 57,333,578 people using RT-PCR, TCM, and antigen rapid tests. There were 25,385 suspected cases.
 Indonesia confirmed 30,156 new cases, bringing the total number to 5,723,858. 46,669 patients recovered, bringing the number to 5,073,522. 322 patients deceased, bringing the tally to 149,918. All 514 municipalities and regencies had reported at least one positive case.
 As of 18:00 WIB (UTC+7), 191,932,033 people had taken the first dose of vaccine, 147,740,994 had completed the second dose, and 12,256,234 had been inoculated with the third dose.
 6 March
 87,107,018 specimens had been tested from 57,539,120 people using RT-PCR, TCM, and antigen rapid tests. There were 16,248 suspected cases.
 Indonesia confirmed 24,867 new cases, bringing the total number to 5,748,725. 49,080 patients recovered, bringing the number to 5,122,602. 254 patients deceased, bringing the tally to 150,172.
 As of 18:00 WIB (UTC+7), 192,025,521 people had taken the first dose of vaccine, 147,939,574 had completed the second dose, and 12,451,694 had been inoculated with the third dose.
 There were a decrease of active cases by 24,467, the most since 9 August 2021.
 7 March
 87,481,657 specimens had been tested from 57,754,516 people using RT-PCR, TCM, and antigen rapid tests. There were 17,272 suspected cases.
 Indonesia confirmed 21,380 new cases, bringing the total number to 5,770,105. 48,800 patients recovered, bringing the number to 5,171,402. 258 patients deceased, bringing the tally to 150,430. All 514 municipalities and regencies had reported at least one positive case.
 As of 18:00 WIB (UTC+7), 192,134,629 people had taken the first dose of vaccine, 148,347,433 had completed the second dose, and 12,698,128 had been inoculated with the third dose.
 There were a decrease of active cases by 27,678, breaking the all-time record set on 9 August 2021.
 The government had allowed domestic travellers by air, land, and water transport to travel without an antigen or PCR test result if they had been vaccinated at least twice.
 The government extended the community activities restrictions enforcement until 14 March in Java and Bali.
 8 March
 87,892,223 specimens had been tested from 57,981,772 people using RT-PCR, TCM, and antigen rapid tests. There were 25,743 suspected cases.
 Indonesia confirmed 30,148 new cases, bringing the total number to 5,800,253. 55,128 patients recovered, bringing the number to 5,226,530. 401 patients deceased – the highest since 8 September 2021, bringing the tally to 150,831. All 514 municipalities and regencies had reported at least one positive case.
 As of 18:00 WIB (UTC+7), 192,263,553 people had taken the first dose of vaccine, 148,587,692 had completed the second dose, and 12,847,308 had been inoculated with the third dose.
 9 March
 88,218,970 specimens had been tested from 58,166,096 people using RT-PCR, TCM, and antigen rapid tests. There were 23,729 suspected cases.
 Indonesia confirmed 26,336 new cases, bringing the total number to 5,826,589. 31,705 patients recovered, bringing the number to 5,258,235. 304 patients deceased, bringing the tally to 151,135. All 514 municipalities and regencies had reported at least one positive case.
 As of 18:00 WIB (UTC+7), 192,436,598 people had taken the first dose of vaccine, 149,122,853 had completed the second dose, and 13,278,390 had been inoculated with the third dose.
 10 March
 88,476,967 specimens had been tested from 58,303,860 people using RT-PCR, TCM, and antigen rapid tests. There were 21,733 suspected cases.
 Indonesia confirmed 21,311 new cases, bringing the total number to 5,847,900. 38,399 patients recovered, bringing the number to 5,296,634. 278 patients deceased, bringing the tally to 151,413. All 514 municipalities and regencies had reported at least one positive case.
 As of 18:00 WIB (UTC+7), 192,891,436 people had taken the first dose of vaccine, 150,069,223 had completed the second dose, and 13,905,146 had been inoculated with the third dose.
 The government extended the expiration date of 18 million vaccines as it would be expired in the near future.
 11 March
 88,699,468 specimens had been tested from 58,383,641 people using RT-PCR, TCM, and antigen rapid tests. There were 13,944 suspected cases.
 Indonesia confirmed 16,110 new cases – the lowest since 1 February 2022, bringing the total number to 5,864,010. 39,212 patients recovered, bringing the number to 5,335,846. 290 patients deceased, bringing the tally to 151,703. All 514 municipalities and regencies had reported at least one positive case.
 As of 18:00 WIB (UTC+7), 193,118,158 people had taken the first dose of vaccine, 150,481,249 had completed the second dose, and 14,211,590 had been inoculated with the third dose.
 12 March
 88,910,570 specimens had been tested from 58,482,859 people using RT-PCR, TCM, and antigen rapid tests. There were 14,812 suspected cases.
 Indonesia confirmed 14,900 new cases – the lowest since 31 January 2022, bringing the total number to 5,878,910. 33,733 patients recovered, bringing the number to 5,369,579. 248 patients deceased, bringing the tally to 151,951. All 514 municipalities and regencies had reported at least one positive case.
 As of 18:00 WIB (UTC+7), 193,313,476 people had taken the first dose of vaccine, 150,993,950 had completed the second dose, and 14,554,434 had been inoculated with the third dose.
 13 March
 89,081,410 specimens had been tested from 58,583,037 people using RT-PCR, TCM, and antigen rapid tests. There were 9,260 suspected cases.
 Indonesia confirmed 11,585 new cases – the lowest since 31 January 2022, bringing the total number to 5,890,495. 25,854 patients recovered, bringing the number to 5,395,433. 215 patients deceased, bringing the tally to 152,166. All 514 municipalities and regencies had reported at least one positive case.
 As of 18:00 WIB (UTC+7), 193,427,015 people had taken the first dose of vaccine, 151,412,614 had completed the second dose, and 14,610,790 had been inoculated with the third dose.
 14 March
 89,276,639 specimens had been tested from 58,702,844 people using RT-PCR, TCM, and antigen rapid tests. There were 10,611 suspected cases.
 Indonesia confirmed 9,629 new cases – the lowest since 27 January 2022, bringing the total number to 5,900,124. 39,296 patients recovered, bringing the number to 5,434,729. 271 patients deceased, bringing the tally to 152,437. All 514 municipalities and regencies had reported at least one positive case.
 As of 18:00 WIB (UTC+7), 193,591,293 people had taken the first dose of vaccine, 151,693,762 had completed the second dose, and 14,724,644 had been inoculated with the third dose.
 There were a decrease of active cases by 29,938, breaking the all-time record set on 8 March 2022.
 The government extended the community activities restrictions enforcement until 21 March in Java and Bali and 28 March in the rest of the country.
 15 March
 89,512,643 specimens had been tested from 58,850,880 people using RT-PCR, TCM, and antigen rapid tests. There were 14,508 suspected cases.
 Indonesia confirmed 14,408 new cases, bringing the total number to 5,914,532. 27,615 patients recovered, bringing the number to 5,462,344. 308 patients deceased, bringing the tally to 152,745. All 514 municipalities and regencies had reported at least one positive case.
 As of 18:00 WIB (UTC+7), 193,758,107 people had taken the first dose of vaccine, 152,043,831 had completed the second dose, and 14,963,545 had been inoculated with the third dose.
 16 March
 89,718,792 specimens had been tested from 58,983,039 people using RT-PCR, TCM, and antigen rapid tests. There were 13,199 suspected cases.
 Indonesia confirmed 13,018 new cases, bringing the total number to 5,927,550. 32,262 patients recovered, bringing the number to 5,494,606. 230 patients deceased, bringing the tally to 152,975. All 514 municipalities and regencies had reported at least one positive case.
 As of 18:00 WIB (UTC+7), 193,946,442 people had taken the first dose of vaccine, 152,503,600 had completed the second dose, and 15,308,073 had been inoculated with the third dose.
 17 March
 89,912,818 specimens had been tested from 59,108,042 people using RT-PCR, TCM, and antigen rapid tests. There were 11,569 suspected cases.
 Indonesia confirmed 11,532 new cases, bringing the total number to 5,939,082. 28,787 patients recovered, bringing the number to 5,523,393. 237 patients deceased, bringing the tally to 153,212. All 514 municipalities and regencies had reported at least one positive case.
 As of 18:00 WIB (UTC+7), 194,204,663 people had taken the first dose of vaccine, 152,881,916 had completed the second dose, and 15,626,868 had been inoculated with the third dose.
 18 March
 90,088,638 specimens had been tested from 59,223,545 people using RT-PCR, TCM, and antigen rapid tests. There were 10,714 suspected cases.
 Indonesia confirmed 9,528 new cases – the lowest since 27 January 2022, bringing the total number to 5,948,610. 25,827 patients recovered, bringing the number to 5,549,220. 199 patients deceased, bringing the tally to 153,411. All 514 municipalities and regencies had reported at least one positive case.
 As of 18:00 WIB (UTC+7), 194,493,617 people had taken the first dose of vaccine, 153,560,859 had completed the second dose, and 16,074,636 had been inoculated with the third dose.
 19 March
 90,243,295 specimens had been tested from 59,323,266 people using RT-PCR, TCM, and antigen rapid tests. There were 12,806 suspected cases.
 Indonesia confirmed 7,951 new cases – the lowest since 26 January 2022, bringing the total number to 5,956,561. 24,008 patients recovered, bringing the number to 5,573,228. 188 patients deceased, bringing the tally to 153,599. All 514 municipalities and regencies had reported at least one positive case.
 As of 18:00 WIB (UTC+7), 194,654,514 people had taken the first dose of vaccine, 153,832,549 had completed the second dose, and 16,242,588 had been inoculated with the third dose.
 20 March
 90,365,359 specimens had been tested from 59,400,556 people using RT-PCR, TCM, and antigen rapid tests. There were 5,678 suspected cases.
 Indonesia confirmed 5,922 new cases – the lowest since 25 January 2022, bringing the total number to 5,962,483. 15,829 patients recovered, bringing the number to 5,589,057. 139 patients deceased, bringing the tally to 153,738. All 514 municipalities and regencies had reported at least one positive case.
 As of 18:00 WIB (UTC+7), 194,401,568 people had taken the first dose of vaccine – oddly 252,946 less than the previous day and 92,049 from the day before that, 154,282,694 had completed the second dose, and 16,288,382 had been inoculated with the third dose.
 21 March
 90,519,968 specimens had been tested from 59,503,735 people using RT-PCR, TCM, and antigen rapid tests. There were 5,929 suspected cases.
 Indonesia confirmed 4,699 new cases – the lowest since 24 January 2022, bringing the total number to 5,967,182. 20,888 patients recovered, bringing the number to 5,609,945. 154 patients deceased, bringing the tally to 153,892. All 514 municipalities and regencies had reported at least one positive case.
 As of 18:00 WIB (UTC+7), 194,809,661 people had taken the first dose of vaccine, 154,423,722 had completed the second dose, and 16,380,377 had been inoculated with the third dose.
 The government extended the community activities restrictions enforcement until 28 March in Java and Bali.
 22 March
 90,709,336 specimens had been tested from 59,627,020 people using RT-PCR, TCM, and antigen rapid tests. There were 9,372 suspected cases.
 Indonesia confirmed 7,464 new cases, bringing the total number to 5,974,646. 29,084 patients recovered, bringing the number to 5,639,029. 170 patients deceased, bringing the tally to 154,062. All 514 municipalities and regencies had reported at least one positive case.
 As of 18:00 WIB (UTC+7), 194,988,786 people had taken the first dose of vaccine, 155,520,807 had completed the second dose, and 17,624,402 had been inoculated with the third dose.
 23 March
 90,875,762 specimens had been tested from 59,736,714 people using RT-PCR, TCM, and antigen rapid tests. There were 11,655 suspected cases.
 Indonesia confirmed 6,376 new cases, bringing the total number to 5,981,022. 19,209 patients recovered, bringing the number to 5,658,238. 159 patients deceased, bringing the tally to 154,221. All 514 municipalities and regencies had reported at least one positive case.
 As of 18:00 WIB (UTC+7), 195,316,732 people had taken the first dose of vaccine, 156,248,844 had completed the second dose, and 18,113,837 had been inoculated with the third dose.
 Travellers from abroad who were tested negative and had been vaccinated at least twice were now allowed to enter Indonesia without following mandatory quarantine.
 24 March
 91,035,716 specimens had been tested from 59,847,041 people using RT-PCR, TCM, and antigen rapid tests. There were 7,875 suspected cases.
 Indonesia confirmed 5,808 new cases, bringing the total number to 5,986,830. 18,272 patients recovered, bringing the number to 5,676,510. 122 patients deceased, bringing the tally to 154,343. All 514 municipalities and regencies had reported at least one positive case.
 As of 18:00 WIB (UTC+7), 195,450,519 people had taken the first dose of vaccine, 156,465,415 had completed the second dose, and 18,273,009 had been inoculated with the third dose.
 25 March
 91,179,923 specimens had been tested from 59,946,279 people using RT-PCR, TCM, and antigen rapid tests. There were 8,085 suspected cases.
 Indonesia confirmed 4,857 new cases, bringing the total number to 5,991,687. 14,710 patients recovered, bringing the number to 5,691,220. 120 patients deceased, bringing the tally to 154,463. All 514 municipalities and regencies had reported at least one positive case.
 As of 18:00 WIB (UTC+7), 195,578,922 people had taken the first dose of vaccine, 156,746,612 had completed the second dose, and 18,583,852 had been inoculated with the third dose.
 26 March
 91,308,894 specimens had been tested from 60,036,708 people using RT-PCR, TCM, and antigen rapid tests. There were 6,571 suspected cases.
 Indonesia confirmed 4,189 new cases – the lowest since 24 January 2022, bringing the total number to 5,995,876. 10,943 patients recovered, bringing the number to 5,702,163. 107 patients deceased, bringing the tally to 154,570. All 514 municipalities and regencies had reported at least one positive case.
 As of 18:00 WIB (UTC+7), 195,793,360 people had taken the first dose of vaccine, 157,699,281 had completed the second dose, and 19,840,399 had been inoculated with the third dose.
 27 March
 91,405,206 specimens had been tested from 60,102,108 people using RT-PCR, TCM, and antigen rapid tests. There were 4,163 suspected cases.
 Indonesia confirmed 3,077 new cases – the lowest since 24 January 2022, bringing the total number to 5,998,953. 12,499 patients recovered, bringing the number to 5,714,662. 100 patients deceased, bringing the tally to 154,670. All 514 municipalities and regencies had reported at least one positive case.
 As of 18:00 WIB (UTC+7), 195,899,103 people had taken the first dose of vaccine, 157,854,270 had completed the second dose, and 19,995,908 had been inoculated with the third dose.
 28 March
 91,535,100 specimens had been tested from 60,191,775 people using RT-PCR, TCM, and antigen rapid tests. There were 4,436 suspected cases.
 Indonesia confirmed 2,798 new cases – the lowest since 21 January 2022, bringing the total number to 6,001,751. 10,301 patients recovered, bringing the number to 5,724,963. 104 patients deceased, bringing the tally to 154,774. All 514 municipalities and regencies had reported at least one positive case.
 As of 18:00 WIB (UTC+7), 195,992,326 people had taken the first dose of vaccine, 158,062,017 had completed the second dose, and 20,297,770 had been inoculated with the third dose.
 Indonesia became the second country in Southeast Asia, sixth in Asia, and 18th in the world to pass six million confirmed cases.
 29 March
 91,693,202 specimens had been tested from 60,298,216 people using RT-PCR, TCM, and antigen rapid tests. There were 7,012 suspected cases.
 Indonesia confirmed 3,895 new cases, bringing the total number to 6,005,646. 10,092 patients recovered, bringing the number to 5,735,055. 108 patients deceased, bringing the tally to 154,882. All 514 municipalities and regencies had reported at least one positive case.
 As of 18:00 WIB (UTC+7), 196,240,871 people had taken the first dose of vaccine, 158,830,466 had completed the second dose, and 21,474,870 had been inoculated with the third dose.
 30 March
 91,827,562 specimens had been tested from 60,385,826 people using RT-PCR, TCM, and antigen rapid tests. There were 6,530 suspected cases.
 Indonesia confirmed 3,840 new cases, bringing the total number to 6,009,486. 7,876 patients recovered, bringing the number to 5,742,931. 118 patients deceased, bringing the tally to 155,000. All 514 municipalities and regencies had reported at least one positive case.
 As of 18:00 WIB (UTC+7), 196,442,097 people had taken the first dose of vaccine, 159,179,001 had completed the second dose, and 22,008,804 had been inoculated with the third dose.
 31 March
 91,960,955 specimens had been tested from 60,470,089 people using RT-PCR, TCM, and antigen rapid tests. There were 6,111 suspected cases.
 Indonesia confirmed 3,332 new cases, bringing the total number to 6,012,818. 7,871 patients recovered, bringing the number to 5,750,802. 89 patients deceased – the least since 10 February 2022, bringing the tally to 155,089. All 514 municipalities and regencies had reported at least one positive case.
 As of 18:00 WIB (UTC+7), 196,593,992 people had taken the first dose of vaccine, 159,455,021 had completed the second dose, and 22,539,101 had been inoculated with the third dose.
 Jakarta became the first province to fully vaccinate 100% of its population. However, this data may not reflect the actual situation as many people outside Jakarta also got vaccinated in the province.

April
 1 April
 92,077,404 specimens had been tested from 60,544,610 people using RT-PCR, TCM, and antigen rapid tests. There were 5,214 suspected cases.
 Indonesia confirmed 2,930 new cases – the least since 21 January 2022, bringing the total number to 6,015,748. 9,036 patients recovered, bringing the number to 5,759,838. 75 patients deceased – the least since 10 February 2022, bringing the tally to 155,164. All 514 municipalities and regencies had reported at least one positive case.
 As of 18:00 WIB (UTC+7), 196,777,182 people had taken the first dose of vaccine, 159,794,862 had completed the second dose, and 23,308,990 had been inoculated with the third dose.
 2 April
 92,176,484 specimens had been tested from 60,607,427 people using RT-PCR, TCM, and antigen rapid tests. There were 5,662 suspected cases.
 Indonesia confirmed 2,300 new cases – the least since 20 January 2022, bringing the total number to 6,018,048. 4,798 patients recovered, bringing the number to 5,764,636. 77 patients deceased, bringing the tally to 155,241. All 514 municipalities and regencies had reported at least one positive case.
 As of 18:00 WIB (UTC+7), 196,861,514 people had taken the first dose of vaccine, 159,964,757 had completed the second dose, and 23,604,538 had been inoculated with the third dose.
 3 April
 92,259,399 specimens had been tested from 60,659,724 people using RT-PCR, TCM, and antigen rapid tests. There were 3,360 suspected cases.
 Indonesia confirmed 1,933 new cases – the least since 19 January 2022, bringing the total number to 6,019,981. 4,067 patients recovered, bringing the number to 5,768,703. 47 patients deceased – the least since 5 February 2022, bringing the tally to 155,288. All 514 municipalities and regencies had reported at least one positive case.
 As of 18:00 WIB (UTC+7), 196,872,212 people had taken the first dose of vaccine, 159,988,334 had completed the second dose, and 23,636,279 had been inoculated with the third dose.
 4 April
 92,389,265 specimens had been tested from 60,738,643 people using RT-PCR, TCM, and antigen rapid tests. There were 3,448 suspected cases.
 Indonesia confirmed 1,661 new cases – the least since 18 January 2022, bringing the total number to 6,021,642. 7,355 patients recovered, bringing the number to 5,776,058. 61 patients deceased, bringing the tally to 155,349. All 514 municipalities and regencies had reported at least one positive case.
 As of 18:00 WIB (UTC+7), 196,880,155 people had taken the first dose of vaccine, 160,107,212 had completed the second dose, and 24,046,339 had been inoculated with the third dose.
 5 April
 92,541,687 specimens had been tested from 60,833,246 people using RT-PCR, TCM, and antigen rapid tests. There were 5,755 suspected cases.
 Indonesia confirmed 2,282 new cases, bringing the total number to 6,023,924. 7,241 patients recovered, bringing the number to 5,783,299. 72 patients deceased, bringing the tally to 155,421. All 514 municipalities and regencies had reported at least one positive case.
 As of 18:00 WIB (UTC+7), 196,913,257 people had taken the first dose of vaccine, 160,182,529 had completed the second dose, and 24,261,963 had been inoculated with the third dose.
 6 April
 92,687,409 specimens had been tested from 60,926,819 people using RT-PCR, TCM, and antigen rapid tests. There were 5,077 suspected cases.
 Indonesia confirmed 2,400 new cases, bringing the total number to 6,026,324. 5,415 patients recovered, bringing the number to 5,788,714. 43 patients deceased – the least since 4 February 2022, bringing the tally to 155,464. All 514 municipalities and regencies had reported at least one positive case.
 As of 18:00 WIB (UTC+7), 197,153,141 people had taken the first dose of vaccine, 160,814,841 had completed the second dose, and 25,454,640 had been inoculated with the third dose.
 7 April
 92,817,150 specimens had been tested from 61,010,519 people using RT-PCR, TCM, and antigen rapid tests. There were 4,467 suspected cases.
 Indonesia confirmed 2,089 new cases, bringing the total number to 6,028,413. 5,888 patients recovered, bringing the number to 5,794,602. 45 patients deceased, bringing the tally to 155,509. All 514 municipalities and regencies had reported at least one positive case.
 As of 18:00 WIB (UTC+7), 197,243,959 people had taken the first dose of vaccine, 160,983,733 had completed the second dose, and 25,719,265 had been inoculated with the third dose.
 8 April
 92,947,569 specimens had been tested from 61,095,283 people using RT-PCR, TCM, and antigen rapid tests. There were 5,021 suspected cases.
 Indonesia confirmed 1,755 new cases, bringing the total number to 6,030,168. 3,442 patients recovered, bringing the number to 5,798,044. 48 patients deceased, bringing the tally to 155,556. All 514 municipalities and regencies had reported at least one positive case.
 As of 18:00 WIB (UTC+7), 197,343,681 people had taken the first dose of vaccine, 161,171,449 had completed the second dose, and 26,067,922 had been inoculated with the third dose.
 9 April
 93,069,375 specimens had been tested from 61,180,072 people using RT-PCR, TCM, and antigen rapid tests. There were 4,329 suspected cases.
 Indonesia confirmed 1,469 new cases – the least since 18 January 2022, bringing the total number to 6,031,636. 3,865 patients recovered, bringing the number to 5,801,909. 41 patients deceased – the least since 3 February 2022, bringing the tally to 155,597. All 514 municipalities and regencies had reported at least one positive case.
 As of 18:00 WIB (UTC+7), 197,430,575 people had taken the first dose of vaccine, 161,390,749 had completed the second dose, and 26,649,231 had been inoculated with the third dose.
 10 April
 93,171,527 specimens had been tested from 61,255,169 people using RT-PCR, TCM, and antigen rapid tests. There were 3,068 suspected cases.
 Indonesia confirmed 1,071 new cases – the least since 18 January 2022, bringing the total number to 6,032,707. 2,493 patients recovered, bringing the number to 5,804,402. 29 patients deceased – the least since 2 February 2022, bringing the tally to 155,626. All 514 municipalities and regencies had reported at least one positive case.
 As of 18:00 WIB (UTC+7), 197,505,603 people had taken the first dose of vaccine, 161,456,592 had completed the second dose, and 27,069,328 had been inoculated with the third dose.
 11 April
 93,301,127 specimens had been tested from 61,352,083 people using RT-PCR, TCM, and antigen rapid tests. There were 3,513 suspected cases.
 Indonesia confirmed 1,196 new cases, bringing the total number to 6,033,903. 3,978 patients recovered, bringing the number to 5,808,380. 48 patients deceased, bringing the tally to 155,674. All 514 municipalities and regencies had reported at least one positive case.
 As of 18:00 WIB (UTC+7), 197,599,872 people had taken the first dose of vaccine, 161,645,838 had completed the second dose, and 27,643,377 had been inoculated with the third dose.
 12 April
 93,452,538 specimens had been tested from 61,457,670 people using RT-PCR, TCM, and antigen rapid tests. There were 5,422 suspected cases.
 Indonesia confirmed 1,455 new cases, bringing the total number to 6,035,358. 3,286 patients recovered, bringing the number to 5,811,666. 43 patients deceased, bringing the tally to 155,717. All 514 municipalities and regencies had reported at least one positive case.
 As of 18:00 WIB (UTC+7), 197,664,548 people had taken the first dose of vaccine, 161,769,783 had completed the second dose, and 27,989,859 had been inoculated with the third dose.
 13 April
 93,593,555 specimens had been tested from 61,555,419 people using RT-PCR, TCM, and antigen rapid tests. There were 4,758 suspected cases.
 Indonesia confirmed 1,551 new cases, bringing the total number to 6,036,909. 3,022 patients recovered, bringing the number to 5,814,688. 29 patients deceased – the joint-least since 2 February 2022, bringing the tally to 155,746. All 514 municipalities and regencies had reported at least one positive case.
 As of 18:00 WIB (UTC+7), 197,769,137 people had taken the first dose of vaccine, 162,040,001 had completed the second dose, and 28,725,140 had been inoculated with the third dose.
 14 April
 93,725,462 specimens had been tested from 61,653,691 people using RT-PCR, TCM, and antigen rapid tests. There were 4,107 suspected cases.
 Indonesia confirmed 833 new cases – the least since 17 January 2022, bringing the total number to 6,037,742. 3,216 patients recovered, bringing the number to 5,817,904. 48 patients deceased, bringing the tally to 155,794. All 514 municipalities and regencies had reported at least one positive case.
 As of 18:00 WIB (UTC+7), 197,949,702 people had taken the first dose of vaccine, 162,269,263 had completed the second dose, and 29,410,363 had been inoculated with the third dose.
 15 April
 93,833,067 specimens had been tested from 61,726,675 people using RT-PCR, TCM, and antigen rapid tests. There were 3,108 suspected cases.
 Indonesia confirmed 922 new cases, bringing the total number to 6,038,664. 2,275 patients recovered, bringing the number to 5,820,179. 26 patients deceased – the least since 1 February 2022, bringing the tally to 155,820. All 514 municipalities and regencies had reported at least one positive case.
 As of 18:00 WIB (UTC+7), 198,043,290 people had taken the first dose of vaccine, 162,420,786 had completed the second dose, and 29,919,580 had been inoculated with the third dose.
 16 April
 93,931,526 specimens had been tested from 61,791,927 people using RT-PCR, TCM, and antigen rapid tests. There were 2,555 suspected cases.
 Indonesia confirmed 602 new cases – the least since 10 January 2022, bringing the total number to 6,039,266. 2,768 patients recovered, bringing the number to 5,822,947. 24 patients deceased – the least since 31 January 2022, bringing the tally to 155,844. All 514 municipalities and regencies had reported at least one positive case.
 As of 18:00 WIB (UTC+7), 198,132,695 people had taken the first dose of vaccine, 162,616,023 had completed the second dose, and 30,536,534 had been inoculated with the third dose.
 17 April
 94,034,583 specimens had been tested from 61,858,462 people using RT-PCR, TCM, and antigen rapid tests. There were 2,560 suspected cases.
 Indonesia confirmed 607 new cases, bringing the total number to 6,039,873. 2,782 patients recovered, bringing the number to 5,825,729. 22 patients deceased – the least since 31 January 2022, bringing the tally to 155,866. All 514 municipalities and regencies had reported at least one positive case.
 As of 18:00 WIB (UTC+7), 198,207,672 people had taken the first dose of vaccine, 162,781,789 had completed the second dose, and 31,066,331 had been inoculated with the third dose.
 18 April
 94,163,459 specimens had been tested from 61,951,618 people using RT-PCR, TCM, and antigen rapid tests. There were 2,820 suspected cases.
 Indonesia confirmed 559 new cases – the least since 10 January 2022, bringing the total number to 6,040,432. 7,831 patients recovered – the most since 1 April 2022, bringing the number to 5,833,560. 37 patients deceased, bringing the tally to 155,903. All 514 municipalities and regencies had reported at least one positive case.
 As of 18:00 WIB (UTC+7), 198,288,035 people had taken the first dose of vaccine, 162,951,633 had completed the second dose, and 31,554,788 had been inoculated with the third dose.
 The active cases were down by 7,309, the most since 28 March 2022.
 19 April
 94,310,264 specimens had been tested from 62,061,663 people using RT-PCR, TCM, and antigen rapid tests. There were 5,013 suspected cases.
 Indonesia confirmed 837 new cases, bringing the total number to 6,041,269. 2,750 patients recovered, bringing the number to 5,836,310. 34 patients deceased, bringing the tally to 155,937. All 514 municipalities and regencies had reported at least one positive case.
 As of 18:00 WIB (UTC+7), 198,389,467 people had taken the first dose of vaccine, 163,081,480 had completed the second dose, and 31,954,827 had been inoculated with the third dose.
 20 April
 94,443,369 specimens had been tested from 62,163,393 people using RT-PCR, TCM, and antigen rapid tests. There were 4,799 suspected cases.
 Indonesia confirmed 741 new cases, bringing the total number to 6,042,010. 4,635 patients recovered, bringing the number to 5,840,945. 37 patients deceased, bringing the tally to 155,974. All 514 municipalities and regencies had reported at least one positive case.
 As of 18:00 WIB (UTC+7), 198,529,344 people had taken the first dose of vaccine, 163,236,179 had completed the second dose, and 32,419,289 had been inoculated with the third dose.
 21 April
 94,575,455 specimens had been tested from 62,264,696 people using RT-PCR, TCM, and antigen rapid tests. There were 4,100 suspected cases.
 Indonesia confirmed 585 new cases – the least since 10 January 2022, bringing the total number to 6,042,595. 14,416 patients recovered – the most since 25 March 2022, bringing the number to 5,855,361. 41 patients deceased, bringing the tally to 156,015. All 514 municipalities and regencies had reported at least one positive case.
 As of 18:00 WIB (UTC+7), 198,654,736 people had taken the first dose of vaccine, 163,427,195 had completed the second dose, and 32,994,827 had been inoculated with the third dose.
 The active cases were down by 13,872, the most since 22 March 2022.
 22 April
 94,695,148 specimens had been tested from 62,352,169 people using RT-PCR, TCM, and antigen rapid tests. There were 3,416 suspected cases.
 Indonesia confirmed 651 new cases, bringing the total number to 6,043,246. 10,808 patients recovered, bringing the number to 5,866,169. 25 patients deceased, bringing the tally to 156,040. All 514 municipalities and regencies had reported at least one positive case.
 As of 18:00 WIB (UTC+7), 198,764,145 people had taken the first dose of vaccine, 163,733,471 had completed the second dose, and 34,329,420 had been inoculated with the third dose.
 23 April
 94,810,218 specimens had been tested from 62,435,519 people using RT-PCR, TCM, and antigen rapid tests. There were 3,435 suspected cases.
 Indonesia confirmed 522 new cases – the least since 10 January 2022, bringing the total number to 6,043,768. 2,082 patients recovered, bringing the number to 5,868,251. 27 patients deceased, bringing the tally to 156,067. All 514 municipalities and regencies had reported at least one positive case.
 As of 18:00 WIB (UTC+7), 198,852,236 people had taken the first dose of vaccine, 163,897,956 had completed the second dose, and 34,906,748 had been inoculated with the third dose.
 24 April
 94,904,806 specimens had been tested from 62,508,418 people using RT-PCR, TCM, and antigen rapid tests. There were 2,159 suspected cases.
 Indonesia confirmed 382 new cases – the least since 2 January 2022, bringing the total number to 6,044,150. 2,168 patients recovered, bringing the number to 5,870,419. 33 patients deceased, bringing the tally to 156,100. All 514 municipalities and regencies had reported at least one positive case.
 As of 18:00 WIB (UTC+7), 198,907,985 people had taken the first dose of vaccine, 163,959,616 had completed the second dose, and 35,014,143 had been inoculated with the third dose.
 25 April
 95,024,563 specimens had been tested from 62,597,583 people using RT-PCR, TCM, and antigen rapid tests. There were 2,811 suspected cases.
 Indonesia confirmed 317 new cases – the least since 2 January 2022, bringing the total number to 6,044,467. 4,664 patients recovered, bringing the number to 5,875,083. 33 patients deceased, bringing the tally to 156,133. All 514 municipalities and regencies had reported at least one positive case.
 As of 18:00 WIB (UTC+7), 198,976,344 people had taken the first dose of vaccine, 164,063,663 had completed the second dose, and 35,264,290 had been inoculated with the third dose.
 26 April
 95,155,820 specimens had been tested from 62,696,667 people using RT-PCR, TCM, and antigen rapid tests. There were 4,099 suspected cases.
 Indonesia confirmed 576 new cases, bringing the total number to 6,045,043. 4,058 patients recovered, bringing the number to 5,879,141. 30 patients deceased, bringing the tally to 156,163. All 514 municipalities and regencies had reported at least one positive case.
 As of 18:00 WIB (UTC+7), 199,067,512 people had taken the first dose of vaccine, 164,226,406 had completed the second dose, and 35,642,866 had been inoculated with the third dose.
 The active cases reached below 10,000 for the first time since 18 January 2022.
 27 April
 95,279,624 specimens had been tested from 62,792,403 people using RT-PCR, TCM, and antigen rapid tests. There were 3,382 suspected cases.
 Indonesia confirmed 617 new cases, bringing the total number to 6,045,660. 1,178 patients recovered, bringing the number to 5,880,319. 36 patients deceased, bringing the tally to 156,199. All 514 municipalities and regencies had reported at least one positive case.
 As of 18:00 WIB (UTC+7), 199,144,069 people had taken the first dose of vaccine, 164,375,981 had completed the second dose, and 36,158,933 had been inoculated with the third dose.
 28 April
 95,397,890 specimens had been tested from 62,873,372 people using RT-PCR, TCM, and antigen rapid tests. There were 3,289 suspected cases.
 Indonesia confirmed 412 new cases, bringing the total number to 6,046,072. 1,171 patients recovered, bringing the number to 5,881,490. 18 patients deceased – the least since 31 January 2022, bringing the tally to 156,217. All 514 municipalities and regencies had reported at least one positive case.
 As of 18:00 WIB (UTC+7), 199,234,057 people had taken the first dose of vaccine, 164,713,412 had completed the second dose, and 37,633,864 had been inoculated with the third dose.
 29 April
 95,495,775 specimens had been tested from 62,945,245 people using RT-PCR, TCM, and antigen rapid tests. There were 2,440 suspected cases.
 Indonesia confirmed 395 new cases, bringing the total number to 6,046,467. 572 patients recovered, bringing the number to 5,882,062. 23 patients deceased, bringing the tally to 156,240. All 514 municipalities and regencies had reported at least one positive case.
 As of 18:00 WIB (UTC+7), 199,309,489 people had taken the first dose of vaccine, 165,067,751 had completed the second dose, and 39,341,516 had been inoculated with the third dose.
 30 April
 95,581,660 specimens had been tested from 63,009,743 people using RT-PCR, TCM, and antigen rapid tests. There were 2,269 suspected cases.
 Indonesia confirmed 329 new cases, bringing the total number to 6,046,796. 598 patients recovered, bringing the number to 5,882,660. 17 patients deceased – the least since 30 January 2022, bringing the tally to 156,257. All 514 municipalities and regencies had reported at least one positive case.
 As of 18:00 WIB (UTC+7), 199,348,845 people had taken the first dose of vaccine, 165,140,701 had completed the second dose, and 39,595,859 had been inoculated with the third dose.

May
 1 May
 95,647,196 specimens had been tested from 63,062,181 people using RT-PCR, TCM, and antigen rapid tests. There were 1,368 suspected cases.
 Indonesia confirmed 244 new cases – the least since 2 January 2022, bringing the total number to 6,047,040. 633 patients recovered, bringing the number to 5,883,293. 16 patients deceased – the least since 28 January 2022, bringing the tally to 156,273. All 514 municipalities and regencies had reported at least one positive case.
 As of 18:00 WIB (UTC+7), 198,816,210 people had taken the first dose of vaccine – oddly decreased by 532,635 from the previous day, 165,224,945 had completed the second dose, and 39,702,216 had been inoculated with the third dose.
 2 May
 95,693,154 specimens had been tested from 63,098,015 people using RT-PCR, TCM, and antigen rapid tests. There were 734 suspected cases.
 Indonesia confirmed 168 new cases – the least since 27 December 2021, bringing the total number to 6,047,208. 371 patients recovered, bringing the number to 5,883,664. 14 patients deceased – the least since 28 January 2022, bringing the tally to 156,287. All 514 municipalities and regencies had reported at least one positive case.
 As of 18:00 WIB (UTC+7), 199,252,857 people had taken the first dose of vaccine, 165,370,363 had completed the second dose, and 40,179,606 had been inoculated with the third dose.
 3 May
 95,739,932 specimens had been tested from 63,135,986 people using RT-PCR, TCM, and antigen rapid tests. There were 986 suspected cases.
 Indonesia confirmed 107 new cases – the least since 26 December 2021, bringing the total number to 6,047,315. 395 patients recovered, bringing the number to 5,884,059. 18 patients deceased, bringing the tally to 156,305. All 514 municipalities and regencies had reported at least one positive case.
 As of 18:00 WIB (UTC+7), 199,248,446 people had taken the first dose of vaccine – oddly decreased by 4,411 from the previous day, 165,418,859 had completed the second dose, and 40,372,217 had been inoculated with the third dose.
 4 May
 95,809,698 specimens had been tested from 63,185,636 people using RT-PCR, TCM, and antigen rapid tests. There were 1,437 suspected cases.
 Indonesia confirmed 176 new cases, bringing the total number to 6,047,491. 266 patients recovered, bringing the number to 5,884,325. 16 patients deceased, bringing the tally to 156,321. All 514 municipalities and regencies had reported at least one positive case.
 As of 18:00 WIB (UTC+7), 199,258,639 people had taken the first dose of vaccine, 165,574,517 had completed the second dose, and 40,904,453 had been inoculated with the third dose.
 5 May
 95,898,504 specimens had been tested from 63,253,158 people using RT-PCR, TCM, and antigen rapid tests. There were 1,698 suspected cases.
 Indonesia confirmed 250 new cases, bringing the total number to 6,047,741. 445 patients recovered, bringing the number to 5,884,770. 19 patients deceased, bringing the tally to 156,340. All 514 municipalities and regencies had reported at least one positive case.
 As of 18:00 WIB (UTC+7), 199,270,308 people had taken the first dose of vaccine, 165,596,146 had completed the second dose, and 40,945,020 had been inoculated with the third dose.
 6 May
 95,994,568 specimens had been tested from 63,316,414 people using RT-PCR, TCM, and antigen rapid tests. There were 2,281 suspected cases.
 Indonesia confirmed 245 new cases, bringing the total number to 6,047,986. 329 patients recovered, bringing the number to 5,885,099. 17 patients deceased, bringing the tally to 156,357. All 514 municipalities and regencies had reported at least one positive case.
 As of 18:00 WIB (UTC+7), 199,284,191 people had taken the first dose of vaccine, 165,608,700 had completed the second dose, and 40,967,768 had been inoculated with the third dose.
 7 May
 96,102,159 specimens had been tested from 63,377,670 people using RT-PCR, TCM, and antigen rapid tests. There were 2,227 suspected cases.
 Indonesia confirmed 218 new cases, bringing the total number to 6,048,204. 307 patients recovered, bringing the number to 5,885,406. 14 patients deceased, bringing the tally to 156,371. All 514 municipalities and regencies had reported at least one positive case.
 As of 18:00 WIB (UTC+7), 199,299,789 people had taken the first dose of vaccine, 165,624,719 had completed the second dose, and 40,987,426 had been inoculated with the third dose.
 8 May
 96,221,718 specimens had been tested from 63,442,342 people using RT-PCR, TCM, and antigen rapid tests. There were 2,120 suspected cases.
 Indonesia confirmed 227 new cases, bringing the total number to 6,048,431. 452 patients recovered, bringing the number to 5,885,858. 10 patients deceased – the lowest since 28 January 2022, bringing the tally to 156,381. All 514 municipalities and regencies had reported at least one positive case.
 As of 18:00 WIB (UTC+7), 199,310,483 people had taken the first dose of vaccine, 165,635,365 had completed the second dose, and 41,005,308 had been inoculated with the third dose.
 9 May
 96,426,056 specimens had been tested from 63,565,579 people using RT-PCR, TCM, and antigen rapid tests. There were 2,615 suspected cases.
 Indonesia confirmed 254 new cases, bringing the total number to 6,048,685. 353 patients recovered, bringing the number to 5,886,211. 15 patients deceased, bringing the tally to 156,396. All 514 municipalities and regencies had reported at least one positive case.
 As of 18:00 WIB (UTC+7), 199,334,355 people had taken the first dose of vaccine, 165,652,881 had completed the second dose, and 41,033,773 had been inoculated with the third dose.
 10 May
 96,634,204 specimens had been tested from 63,692,790 people using RT-PCR, TCM, and antigen rapid tests. There were 5,183 suspected cases.
 Indonesia confirmed 456 new cases, bringing the total number to 6,049,141. 659 patients recovered, bringing the number to 5,886,870. 20 patients deceased, bringing the tally to 156,416. All 514 municipalities and regencies had reported at least one positive case.
 As of 18:00 WIB (UTC+7), 199,361,701 people had taken the first dose of vaccine, 165,711,845 had completed the second dose, and 41,151,580 had been inoculated with the third dose.
 11 May
 96,801,225 specimens had been tested from 63,767,118 people using RT-PCR, TCM, and antigen rapid tests. There were 4,930 suspected cases.
 Indonesia confirmed 400 new cases, bringing the total number to 6,049,541. 916 patients recovered, bringing the number to 5,887,786. 8 patients deceased – the lowest since 28 January 2022, bringing the tally to 156,424. All 514 municipalities and regencies had reported at least one positive case.
 As of 18:00 WIB (UTC+7), 199,411,967 people had taken the first dose of vaccine, 165,861,275 had completed the second dose, and 41,658,893 had been inoculated with the third dose.
 The European Union (EU) approved the PeduliLindungi app to be used in the region.
 12 May
 96,968,564 specimens had been tested from 63,845,221 people using RT-PCR, TCM, and antigen rapid tests. There were 4,946 suspected cases.
 Indonesia confirmed 335 new cases, bringing the total number to 6,049,876. 785 patients recovered, bringing the number to 5,888,571. 14 patients deceased, bringing the tally to 156,438. All 514 municipalities and regencies had reported at least one positive case.
 As of 18:00 WIB (UTC+7), 199,464,302 people had taken the first dose of vaccine, 165,987,821 had completed the second dose, and 41,996,998 had been inoculated with the third dose.
 13 May
 97,115,043 specimens had been tested from 63,956,674 people using RT-PCR, TCM, and antigen rapid tests. There were 4,644 suspected cases.
 Indonesia confirmed 335 new cases, bringing the total number to 6,050,211. 254 patients recovered, bringing the number to 5,888,825. 10 patients deceased, bringing the tally to 156,448. All 514 municipalities and regencies had reported at least one positive case.
 As of 18:00 WIB (UTC+7), 199,510,030 people had taken the first dose of vaccine, 166,077,301 had completed the second dose, and 42,207,307 had been inoculated with the third dose.
 The number of active cases was increased for the first time since 26 February 2022.
 14 May
 97,245,391 specimens had been tested from 64,059,707 people using RT-PCR, TCM, and antigen rapid tests. There were 3,953 suspected cases.
 Indonesia confirmed 308 new cases, bringing the total number to 6,050,519. 416 patients recovered, bringing the number to 5,889,241. 5 patients deceased – the joint-lowest since 22 January 2022, bringing the tally to 156,453. All 514 municipalities and regencies had reported at least one positive case.
 As of 18:00 WIB (UTC+7), 199,566,295 people had taken the first dose of vaccine, 166,177,829 had completed the second dose, and 42,481,237 had been inoculated with the third dose.
 15 May
 97,346,292 specimens had been tested from 64,134,782 people using RT-PCR, TCM, and antigen rapid tests. There were 2,386 suspected cases.
 Indonesia confirmed 257 new cases, bringing the total number to 6,050,776. 293 patients recovered, bringing the number to 5,889,534. 5 patients deceased – the joint-lowest since 22 January 2022, bringing the tally to 156,458. All 514 municipalities and regencies had reported at least one positive case.
 As of 18:00 WIB (UTC+7), 199,598,451 people had taken the first dose of vaccine, 166,246,891 had completed the second dose, and 42,669,597 had been inoculated with the third dose.
 The Association of the Southeast Asian Nations (ASEAN) approved the PeduliLindungi app to be used in the region.
 16 May
 97,434,437 specimens had been tested from 64,202,509 people using RT-PCR, TCM, and antigen rapid tests. There were 1,610 suspected cases.
 Indonesia confirmed 182 new cases, bringing the total number to 6,050,958. 263 patients recovered, bringing the number to 5,889,797. 6 patients deceased, bringing the tally to 156,464. All 514 municipalities and regencies had reported at least one positive case.
 As of 18:00 WIB (UTC+7), 199,621,358 people had taken the first dose of vaccine, 166,270,053 had completed the second dose, and 42,715,256 had been inoculated with the third dose.
 17 May
 97,570,814 specimens had been tested from 64,309,123 people using RT-PCR, TCM, and antigen rapid tests. There were 3,221 suspected cases.
 Indonesia confirmed 247 new cases, bringing the total number to 6,051,205. 1,029 patients recovered – the most since 28 April 2022, bringing the number to 5,890,826. 17 patients deceased, bringing the tally to 156,481. All 514 municipalities and regencies had reported at least one positive case.
 As of 18:00 WIB (UTC+7), 199,659,912 people had taken the first dose of vaccine, 166,309,934 had completed the second dose, and 42,782,612 had been inoculated with the third dose.
 President Joko Widodo announced that wearing a mask outdoors or in an open space was made optional. It remained compulsory indoors and in public transportation. Additionally, he also stated that COVID-19 test was no longer needed for vaccinated international travellers coming to Indonesia.
 18 May
 97,722,986 specimens had been tested from 64,425,386 people using RT-PCR, TCM, and antigen rapid tests. There were 4,809 suspected cases.
 Indonesia confirmed 327 new cases, bringing the total number to 6,051,532. 364 patients recovered, bringing the number to 5,891,190. 17 patients deceased, bringing the tally to 156,498. All 514 municipalities and regencies had reported at least one positive case.
 As of 18:00 WIB (UTC+7), 199,711,102 people had taken the first dose of vaccine, 166,400,760 had completed the second dose, and 43,013,182 had been inoculated with the third dose.
 19 May
 97,850,450 specimens had been tested from 64,518,590 people using RT-PCR, TCM, and antigen rapid tests. There were 4,083 suspected cases.
 Indonesia confirmed 318 new cases, bringing the total number to 6,051,850. 384 patients recovered, bringing the number to 5,891,574. 12 patients deceased, bringing the tally to 156,510. All 514 municipalities and regencies had reported at least one positive case.
 As of 18:00 WIB (UTC+7), 199,753,822 people had taken the first dose of vaccine, 166,495,120 had completed the second dose, and 43,231,901 had been inoculated with the third dose.
 20 May
 97,949,335 specimens had been tested from 64,585,271 people using RT-PCR, TCM, and antigen rapid tests. There were 4,942 suspected cases.
 Indonesia confirmed 250 new cases, bringing the total number to 6,052,100. 298 patients recovered, bringing the number to 5,891,872. 3 patients deceased – the lowest since 21 January 2022, bringing the tally to 156,513. All 514 municipalities and regencies had reported at least one positive case.
 As of 18:00 WIB (UTC+7), 199,811,769 people had taken the first dose of vaccine, 166,668,997 had completed the second dose, and 43,668,066 had been inoculated with the third dose.
 21 May
 98,027,949 specimens had been tested from 64,640,321 people using RT-PCR, TCM, and antigen rapid tests. There were 3,749 suspected cases.
 Indonesia confirmed 263 new cases, bringing the total number to 6,052,363. 254 patients recovered, bringing the number to 5,892,126. 6 patients deceased, bringing the tally to 157,519. All 514 municipalities and regencies had reported at least one positive case.
 As of 18:00 WIB (UTC+7), 199,846,746 people had taken the first dose of vaccine, 166,787,315 had completed the second dose, and 43,994,727 had been inoculated with the third dose.
 22 May
 98,090,610 specimens had been tested from 64,686,539 people using RT-PCR, TCM, and antigen rapid tests. There were 2,477 suspected cases.
 Indonesia confirmed 227 new cases, bringing the total number to 6,052,590. 285 patients recovered, bringing the number to 5,892,411. 3 patients deceased – the joint-lowest since 21 January 2022, bringing the tally to 156,522. All 514 municipalities and regencies had reported at least one positive case.
 As of 18:00 WIB (UTC+7), 199,879,236 people had taken the first dose of vaccine, 166,838,952 had completed the second dose, and 44,116,951 had been inoculated with the third dose.
 23 May
 98,171,807 specimens had been tested from 64,747,340 people using RT-PCR, TCM, and antigen rapid tests. There were 2,610 suspected cases.
 Indonesia confirmed 174 new cases, bringing the total number to 6,052,764. 929 patients recovered, bringing the number to 5,893,340. 12 patients deceased, bringing the tally to 156,534. All 514 municipalities and regencies had reported at least one positive case.
 As of 18:00 WIB (UTC+7), 199,921,704 people had taken the first dose of vaccine, 166,923,206 had completed the second dose, and 44,317,580 had been inoculated with the third dose.
 The active cases number was below 3,000 for the first time since 10 April 2020.
 24 May
 98,271,696 specimens had been tested from 64,818,588 people using RT-PCR, TCM, and antigen rapid tests. There were 4,295 suspected cases.
 Indonesia confirmed 345 new cases, bringing the total number to 6,053,109. 288 patients recovered, bringing the number to 5,893,628. 14 patients deceased, bringing the tally to 156,548. All 514 municipalities and regencies had reported at least one positive case.
 As of 18:00 WIB (UTC+7), 199,973,715 people had taken the first dose of vaccine, 167,004,069 had completed the second dose, and 44,505,755 had been inoculated with the third dose.
 25 May
 98,357,716 specimens had been tested from 64,878,412 people using RT-PCR, TCM, and antigen rapid tests. There were 3,606 suspected cases.
 Indonesia confirmed 315 new cases, bringing the total number to 6,053,424. 232 patients recovered, bringing the number to 5,893,860. 5 patients deceased, bringing the tally to 156,553. All 514 municipalities and regencies had reported at least one positive case.
 As of 18:00 WIB (UTC+7), 200,037,480 people had taken the first dose of vaccine, 167,102,580 had completed the second dose, and 44,774,988 had been inoculated with the third dose.
 26 May
 98,415,619 specimens had been tested from 64,919,496 people using RT-PCR, TCM, and antigen rapid tests. There were 2,204 suspected cases.
 Indonesia confirmed 246 new cases, bringing the total number to 6,053,670. 243 patients recovered, bringing the number to 5,894,103. 3 patients deceased – the joint-lowest since 21 January 2022, bringing the tally to 156,556. All 514 municipalities and regencies had reported at least one positive case.
 As of 18:00 WIB (UTC+7), 200,081,981 people had taken the first dose of vaccine, 167,157,371 had completed the second dose, and 44,919,600 had been inoculated with the third dose.
 The number of active cases was stuck for the first time since 21 December 2021.
 27 May
 98,479,250 specimens had been tested from 64,958,473 people using RT-PCR, TCM, and antigen rapid tests. There were 2,306 suspected cases.
 Indonesia confirmed 224 new cases, bringing the total number to 6,053,894. 277 patients recovered, bringing the number to 5,894,380. 9 patients deceased, bringing the tally to 156,565. All 514 municipalities and regencies had reported at least one positive case.
 As of 18:00 WIB (UTC+7), 200,130,228 people had taken the first dose of vaccine, 167,221,729 had completed the second dose, and 45,124,569 had been inoculated with the third dose.
 28 May
 98,544,606 specimens had been tested from 64,994,687 people using RT-PCR, TCM, and antigen rapid tests. There were 2,390 suspected cases.
 Indonesia confirmed 279 new cases, bringing the total number to 6,054,173. 248 patients recovered, bringing the number to 5,894,628. 8 patients deceased, bringing the tally to 156,573. All 514 municipalities and regencies had reported at least one positive case.
 As of 18:00 WIB (UTC+7), 200,174,892 people had taken the first dose of vaccine, 167,284,133 had completed the second dose, and 45,289,565 had been inoculated with the third dose.
 29 May
 98,592,166 specimens had been tested from 65,020,899 people using RT-PCR, TCM, and antigen rapid tests. There were 1,815 suspected cases.
 Indonesia confirmed 242 new cases, bringing the total number to 6,054,415. 261 patients recovered, bringing the number to 5,894,889. 1 patient deceased – the joint-lowest since 2 January 2022, bringing the tally to 156,574. All 514 municipalities and regencies had reported at least one positive case.
 As of 18:00 WIB (UTC+7), 200,193,609 people had taken the first dose of vaccine, 167,322,563 had completed the second dose, and 45,408,759 had been inoculated with the third dose.
 30 May
 98,662,159 specimens had been tested from 65,055,235 people using RT-PCR, TCM, and antigen rapid tests. There were 2,166 suspected cases.
 Indonesia confirmed 218 new cases, bringing the total number to 6,054,633. 287 patients recovered, bringing the number to 5,895,176. 12 patients deceased, bringing the tally to 156,586. All 514 municipalities and regencies had reported at least one positive case.
 As of 18:00 WIB (UTC+7), 200,238,075 people had taken the first dose of vaccine, 167,383,521 had completed the second dose, and 45,604,167 had been inoculated with the third dose.
 The active cases number was 2,871, the lowest since 9 April 2020.
 31 May
 98,738,878 specimens had been tested from 65,102,925 people using RT-PCR, TCM, and antigen rapid tests. There were 3,484 suspected cases.
 Indonesia confirmed 340 new cases, bringing the total number to 6,054,973. 247 patients recovered, bringing the number to 5,895,423. 5 patients deceased, bringing the tally to 156,591. All 514 municipalities and regencies had reported at least one positive case.
 As of 18:00 WIB (UTC+7), 200,271,193 people had taken the first dose of vaccine, 167,428,949 had completed the second dose, and 45,723,233 had been inoculated with the third dose.
 The number of active cases was increased by 88, the most since 26 February 2022.

June
 1 June
 98,796,457 specimens had been tested from 65,144,760 people using RT-PCR, TCM, and antigen rapid tests. There were 2,445 suspected cases.
 Indonesia confirmed 368 new cases, bringing the total number to 6,055,341. 183 patients recovered, bringing the number to 5,895,606. 3 patients deceased, bringing the tally to 156,594. All 514 municipalities and regencies had reported at least one positive case.
 As of 18:00 WIB (UTC+7), 200,316,082 people had taken the first dose of vaccine, 167,495,285 had completed the second dose, and 45,926,767 had been inoculated with the third dose.
 The number of active cases was increased by 182, the most since 26 February 2022.
 2 June
 98,855,980 specimens had been tested from 65,187,785 people using RT-PCR, TCM, and antigen rapid tests. There were 2,333 suspected cases.
 Indonesia confirmed 304 new cases, bringing the total number to 6,055,645. 334 patients recovered, bringing the number to 5,895,940. 6 patients deceased, bringing the tally to 156,600. All 514 municipalities and regencies had reported at least one positive case.
 As of 18:00 WIB (UTC+7), 200,362,545 people had taken the first dose of vaccine, 167,558,082 had completed the second dose, and 46,128,668 had been inoculated with the third dose.
 3 June
 98,928,466 specimens had been tested from 65,239,224 people using RT-PCR, TCM, and antigen rapid tests. There were 3,047 suspected cases.
 Indonesia confirmed 372 new cases, bringing the total number to 6,056,017. 350 patients recovered, bringing the number to 5,896,290. 4 patients deceased, bringing the tally to 156,604. All 514 municipalities and regencies had reported at least one positive case.
 As of 18:00 WIB (UTC+7), 200,403,116 people had taken the first dose of vaccine, 167,606,389 had completed the second dose, and 46,258,814 had been inoculated with the third dose.
 4 June
 98,989,397 specimens had been tested from 65,284,339 people using RT-PCR, TCM, and antigen rapid tests. There were 2,767 suspected cases.
 Indonesia confirmed 395 new cases, bringing the total number to 6,056,412. 258 patients recovered, bringing the number to 5,896,290. 6 patients deceased, bringing the tally to 156,610. All 514 municipalities and regencies had reported at least one positive case.
 As of 18:00 WIB (UTC+7), 200,443,837 people had taken the first dose of vaccine, 167,651,287 had completed the second dose, and 46,407,301 had been inoculated with the third dose.
 5 June
 99,034,254 specimens had been tested from 65,318,233 people using RT-PCR, TCM, and antigen rapid tests. There were 1,816 suspected cases.
 Indonesia confirmed 388 new cases, bringing the total number to 6,056,800. 204 patients recovered, bringing the number to 5,896,752. 5 patients deceased, bringing the tally to 156,615. All 514 municipalities and regencies had reported at least one positive case.
 As of 18:00 WIB (UTC+7), 200,466,699 people had taken the first dose of vaccine, 167,692,817 had completed the second dose, and 46,520,981 had been inoculated with the third dose.
 The number of active cases was increased for three consecutive days, the first since 20 February 2022.
 6 June
 99,102,309 specimens had been tested from 65,370,128 people using RT-PCR, TCM, and antigen rapid tests. There were 2,052 suspected cases.
 Indonesia confirmed 342 new cases, bringing the total number to 6,057,142. 270 patients recovered, bringing the number to 5,897,022. 7 patients deceased, bringing the tally to 156,622. All 514 municipalities and regencies had reported at least one positive case.
 As of 18:00 WIB (UTC+7), 200,503,941 people had taken the first dose of vaccine, 167,746,220 had completed the second dose, and 46,708,021 had been inoculated with the third dose.
 The number of active cases was increased for four consecutive days, the first since 20 February 2022.
 7 June
 99,181,588 specimens had been tested from 65,429,135 people using RT-PCR, TCM, and antigen rapid tests. There were 3,425 suspected cases.
 Indonesia confirmed 518 new cases – the most since 27 April 2022, bringing the total number to 6,057,660. 350 patients recovered, bringing the number to 5,897,372. 2 patients deceased, bringing the tally to 156,624. All 514 municipalities and regencies had reported at least one positive case.
 As of 18:00 WIB (UTC+7), 200,643,463 people had taken the first dose of vaccine, 167,815,074 had completed the second dose, and 46,907,475 had been inoculated with the third dose.
 The number of active cases was increased for five consecutive days, the first since 20 February 2022.
 8 June
 99,254,486 specimens had been tested from 65,480,193 people using RT-PCR, TCM, and antigen rapid tests. There were 4,068 suspected cases.
 Indonesia confirmed 520 new cases – the most since 27 April 2022, bringing the total number to 6,058,180. 258 patients recovered, bringing the number to 5,897,630. 4 patients deceased, bringing the tally to 156,628. All 514 municipalities and regencies had reported at least one positive case.
 As of 18:00 WIB (UTC+7), 200,689,751 people had taken the first dose of vaccine, 167,877,006 had completed the second dose, and 47,103,351 had been inoculated with the third dose.
 The number of active cases was increased for six consecutive days, the first since 20 February 2022. It was increased by 258, the most since 26 February 2022.
 9 June
 99,325,518 specimens had been tested from 65,528,376 people using RT-PCR, TCM, and antigen rapid tests. There were 3,339 suspected cases.
 Indonesia confirmed 556 new cases – the most since 27 April 2022, bringing the total number to 6,058,736. 410 patients recovered, bringing the number to 5,898,040. 7 patients deceased, bringing the tally to 156,635. All 514 municipalities and regencies had reported at least one positive case.
 As of 18:00 WIB (UTC+7), 200,746,142 people had taken the first dose of vaccine, 167,941,080 had completed the second dose, and 47,303,129 had been inoculated with the third dose.
 The number of active cases was increased for seven consecutive days, the first since 20 February 2022.
 10 June
 99,391,159 specimens had been tested from 65,572,074 people using RT-PCR, TCM, and antigen rapid tests. There were 3,513 suspected cases.
 Indonesia confirmed 627 new cases – the most since 22 April 2022, bringing the total number to 6,059,363. 344 patients recovered, bringing the number to 5,898,384. 3 patients deceased, bringing the tally to 156,638. All 514 municipalities and regencies had reported at least one positive case.
 As of 18:00 WIB (UTC+7), 200,790,283 people had taken the first dose of vaccine, 167,997,200 had completed the second dose, and 47,478,556 had been inoculated with the third dose.
 The number of active cases was increased for eight consecutive days, the first since 20 February 2022. It was increased by 280, the most since 26 February 2022.
 Indonesia's Minister of Health, Budi Gunadi Sadikin, announced that the subvariant of Omicron, BA.4 and BA.5, had been detected in Bali.
 11 June
 99,447,309 specimens had been tested from 65,615,881 people using RT-PCR, TCM, and antigen rapid tests. There were 3,288 suspected cases.
 Indonesia confirmed 574 new cases, bringing the total number to 6,059,937. 374 patients recovered, bringing the number to 5,898,758. 3 patients deceased, bringing the tally to 156,641. All 514 municipalities and regencies had reported at least one positive case.
 As of 18:00 WIB (UTC+7), 200,823,072 people had taken the first dose of vaccine, 168,039,621 had completed the second dose, and 47,588,418 had been inoculated with the third dose.
 The number of active cases was increased for nine consecutive days, the first since 20 February 2022.
 12 June
 99,493,108 specimens had been tested from 65,649,800 people using RT-PCR, TCM, and antigen rapid tests. There were 1,967 suspected cases.
 Indonesia confirmed 551 new cases, bringing the total number to 6,060,488. 353 patients recovered, bringing the number to 5,899,111. 2 patients deceased, bringing the tally to 156,643. All 514 municipalities and regencies had reported at least one positive case.
 As of 18:00 WIB (UTC+7), 200,841,551 people had taken the first dose of vaccine, 168,067,412 had completed the second dose, and 47,647,399 had been inoculated with the third dose.
 The number of active cases was increased for ten consecutive days, the first since 20 February 2022.
 13 June
 99,559,408 specimens had been tested from 65,694,367 people using RT-PCR, TCM, and antigen rapid tests. There were 2,475 suspected cases.
 Indonesia confirmed 591 new cases, bringing the total number to 6,061,079. 390 patients recovered, bringing the number to 5,899,501. 9 patients deceased, bringing the tally to 156,652. All 514 municipalities and regencies had reported at least one positive case.
 As of 18:00 WIB (UTC+7), 200,873,482 people had taken the first dose of vaccine, 168,103,637 had completed the second dose, and 47,755,804 had been inoculated with the third dose.
 The number of active cases was increased for eleven consecutive days, the first since 20 February 2022.
 14 June
 99,638,928 specimens had been tested from 65,746,172 people using RT-PCR, TCM, and antigen rapid tests. There were 4,030 suspected cases.
 Indonesia confirmed 930 new cases – the most since 13 April 2022, bringing the total number to 6,062,009. 548 patients recovered, bringing the number to 5,900,049. 10 patients deceased, bringing the tally to 156,662. All 514 municipalities and regencies had reported at least one positive case.
 As of 18:00 WIB (UTC+7), 200,933,060 people had taken the first dose of vaccine, 168,176,347 had completed the second dose, and 48,035,305 had been inoculated with the third dose.
 The number of active cases was increased for 12 consecutive days, the first since 20 February 2022. It was increased by 372, the most since 26 February 2022.
 15 June
 99,717,929 specimens had been tested from 65,803,988 people using RT-PCR, TCM, and antigen rapid tests. There were 4,455 suspected cases.
 Indonesia confirmed 1,242 new cases – the most since 13 April 2022, bringing the total number to 6,063,251. 525 patients recovered, bringing the number to 5,900,574. 8 patients deceased, bringing the tally to 156,670. All 514 municipalities and regencies had reported at least one positive case.
 As of 18:00 WIB (UTC+7), 200,991,980 people had taken the first dose of vaccine, 168,244,200 had completed the second dose, and 48,266,572 had been inoculated with the third dose.
 The number of active cases was increased for 13 consecutive days, the first since 20 February 2022. It was increased by 709, the most since 26 February 2022.
 16 June
 99,794,388 specimens had been tested from 65,859,164 people using RT-PCR, TCM, and antigen rapid tests. There were 4,054 suspected cases.
 Indonesia confirmed 1,173 new cases, bringing the total number to 6,064,424. 509 patients recovered, bringing the number to 5,901,083. 3 patients deceased, bringing the tally to 156,673. All 514 municipalities and regencies had reported at least one positive case.
 As of 18:00 WIB (UTC+7), 201,053,516 people had taken the first dose of vaccine, 168,314,783 had completed the second dose, and 48,491,305 had been inoculated with the third dose.
 The number of active cases was increased for 14 consecutive days, the first since 20 February 2022.
 17 June
 99,869,993 specimens had been tested from 65,911,973 people using RT-PCR, TCM, and antigen rapid tests. There were 4,186 suspected cases.
 Indonesia confirmed 1,220 new cases, bringing the total number to 6,065,644. 556 patients recovered, bringing the number to 5,901,639. 6 patients deceased, bringing the tally to 156,679. All 514 municipalities and regencies had reported at least one positive case.
 As of 18:00 WIB (UTC+7), 201,102,749 people had taken the first dose of vaccine, 168,388,365 had completed the second dose, and 48,754,475 had been inoculated with the third dose.
 The number of active cases was increased for 15 consecutive days, the first since 20 February 2022.
 18 June
 99,933,102 specimens had been tested from 65,958,237 people using RT-PCR, TCM, and antigen rapid tests. There were 3,606 suspected cases.
 Indonesia confirmed 1,264 new cases – the most since 13 April 2022, bringing the total number to 6,066,908. 523 patients recovered, bringing the number to 5,902,162. 5 patients deceased, bringing the tally to 156,684. All 514 municipalities and regencies had reported at least one positive case.
 As of 18:00 WIB (UTC+7), 201,136,909 people had taken the first dose of vaccine, 168,440,142 had completed the second dose, and 48,908,344 had been inoculated with the third dose.
 The number of active cases was increased for 16 consecutive days, the first since 20 February 2022.
 19 June
 99,984,153 specimens had been tested from 65,990,523 people using RT-PCR, TCM, and antigen rapid tests. There were 2,296 suspected cases.
 Indonesia confirmed 1,167 new cases, bringing the total number to 6,068,075. 632 patients recovered, bringing the number to 5,902,794. 3 patients deceased, bringing the tally to 156,687. All 514 municipalities and regencies had reported at least one positive case.
 As of 18:00 WIB (UTC+7), 201,155,020 people had taken the first dose of vaccine, 168,472,144 had completed the second dose, and 49,017,933 had been inoculated with the third dose.
 The number of active cases was increased for 17 consecutive days, the first since 20 February 2022.
 20 June
 100,056,176 specimens had been tested from 66,042,199 people using RT-PCR, TCM, and antigen rapid tests. There were 2,617 suspected cases.
 Indonesia confirmed 1,180 new cases, bringing the total number to 6,069,255. 667 patients recovered, bringing the number to 5,903,461. 8 patients deceased, bringing the tally to 156,695. All 514 municipalities and regencies had reported at least one positive case.
 As of 18:00 WIB (UTC+7), 201,178,911 people had taken the first dose of vaccine, 168,503,964 had completed the second dose, and 49,132,246 had been inoculated with the third dose.
 The number of active cases was increased for 18 consecutive days, the first since 20 February 2022.
 The number of people tested crossed 100 million people.
 21 June
 100,147,276 specimens had been tested from 66,103,520 people using RT-PCR, TCM, and antigen rapid tests. There were 4,411 suspected cases.
 Indonesia confirmed 1,678 new cases – the most since 8 April 2022, bringing the total number to 6,070,933. 677 patients recovered, bringing the number to 5,904,138. 5 patients deceased, bringing the tally to 156,700. All 514 municipalities and regencies had reported at least one positive case.
 As of 18:00 WIB (UTC+7), 201,214,647 people had taken the first dose of vaccine, 168,537,355 had completed the second dose, and 49,206,082 had been inoculated with the third dose.
 The number of active cases was increased for 19 consecutive days, the first since 20 February 2022. It was increased by 996, the most since 26 February 2022.
 22 June
 100,230,120 specimens had been tested from 66,163,667 people using RT-PCR, TCM, and antigen rapid tests. There were 4,156 suspected cases.
 Indonesia confirmed 1,985 new cases – the most since 7 April 2022, bringing the total number to 6,072,918. 687 patients recovered, bringing the number to 5,904,825. 2 patients deceased, bringing the tally to 156,702. All 514 municipalities and regencies had reported at least one positive case.
 As of 18:00 WIB (UTC+7), 201,250,544 people had taken the first dose of vaccine, 168,596,629 had completed the second dose, and 49,375,958 had been inoculated with the third dose.
 The number of active cases was increased for 20 consecutive days, the first since 20 February 2022. It was increased by 1,296, the most since 26 February 2022.
 23 June
 100,307,541 specimens had been tested from 66,212,198 people using RT-PCR, TCM, and antigen rapid tests. There were 4,293 suspected cases.
 Indonesia confirmed 1,907 new cases, bringing the total number to 6,074,825. 1,146 patients recovered – the most since 28 April 2022, bringing the number to 5,905,971. 4 patients deceased, bringing the tally to 156,706. All 514 municipalities and regencies had reported at least one positive case.
 As of 18:00 WIB (UTC+7), 201,288,162 people had taken the first dose of vaccine, 168,653,377 had completed the second dose, and 49,540,378 had been inoculated with the third dose.
 The number of active cases was increased for 21 consecutive days, the first since 20 February 2022.
 24 June
 100,384,534 specimens had been tested from 66,262,363 people using RT-PCR, TCM, and antigen rapid tests. There were 4,436 suspected cases.
 Indonesia confirmed 2,069 new cases – the most since 7 April 2022, bringing the total number to 6,076,894. 998 patients recovered, bringing the number to 5,906,969. 5 patients deceased, bringing the tally to 156,711. All 514 municipalities and regencies had reported at least one positive case.
 As of 18:00 WIB (UTC+7), 201,319,068 people had taken the first dose of vaccine, 168,724,975 had completed the second dose, and 49,754,752 had been inoculated with the third dose.
 The number of active cases was increased for 22 consecutive days, the first since 20 February 2022.
 25 June
 100,449,034 specimens had been tested from 66,310,567 people using RT-PCR, TCM, and antigen rapid tests. There were 4,417 suspected cases.
 Indonesia confirmed 1,831 new cases, bringing the total number to 6,078,725. 1,074 patients recovered, bringing the number to 5,908,043. 3 patients deceased, bringing the tally to 156,714. All 514 municipalities and regencies had reported at least one positive case.
 As of 18:00 WIB (UTC+7), 201,343,109 people had taken the first dose of vaccine, 168,777,555 had completed the second dose, and 49,915,289 had been inoculated with the third dose.
 The number of active cases was increased for 23 consecutive days, the first since 20 February 2022.
 26 June
 100,499,919 specimens had been tested from 66,349,413 people using RT-PCR, TCM, and antigen rapid tests. There were 2,047 suspected cases.
 Indonesia confirmed 1,726 new cases, bringing the total number to 6,080,451. 1,175 patients recovered – the most since 27 April 2022, bringing the number to 5,909,218. 3 patients deceased, bringing the tally to 156,717. All 514 municipalities and regencies had reported at least one positive case.
 As of 18:00 WIB (UTC+7), 201,359,913 people had taken the first dose of vaccine, 168,818,399 had completed the second dose, and 50,029,706 had been inoculated with the third dose.
 The number of active cases was increased for 24 consecutive days, the first since 20 February 2022.
 27 June
 100,572,843 specimens had been tested from 66,403,284 people using RT-PCR, TCM, and antigen rapid tests. There were 3,052 suspected cases.
 Indonesia confirmed 1,445 new cases, bringing the total number to 6,081,896. 1,637 patients recovered – the most since 26 April 2022, bringing the number to 5,910,855. 9 patients deceased, bringing the tally to 156,726. All 514 municipalities and regencies had reported at least one positive case.
 As of 18:00 WIB (UTC+7), 201,385,987 people had taken the first dose of vaccine, 168,862,828 had completed the second dose, and 50,155,347 had been inoculated with the third dose.
 The number of active cases was decreased by 201, the highest since 23 May 2022.
 28 June
 100,661,561 specimens had been tested from 66,465,971 people using RT-PCR, TCM, and antigen rapid tests. There were 4,822 suspected cases.
 Indonesia confirmed 2,167 new cases – the most since 6 April 2022, bringing the total number to 6,084,063. 1,170 patients recovered, bringing the number to 5,912,025. 2 patients deceased, bringing the tally to 156,728. All 514 municipalities and regencies had reported at least one positive case.
 As of 18:00 WIB (UTC+7), 201,425,813 people had taken the first dose of vaccine, 168,908,467 had completed the second dose, and 50,259,992 had been inoculated with the third dose.
 29 June
 100,741,581 specimens had been tested from 66,520,688 people using RT-PCR, TCM, and antigen rapid tests. There were 4,937 suspected cases.
 Indonesia confirmed 2,149 new cases, bringing the total number to 6,086,212. 1,282 patients recovered, bringing the number to 5,913,307. 3 patients deceased, bringing the tally to 156,731. All 514 municipalities and regencies had reported at least one positive case.
 As of 18:00 WIB (UTC+7), 201,464,272 people had taken the first dose of vaccine, 168,973,297 had completed the second dose, and 50,446,878 had been inoculated with the third dose.
 30 June
 100,820,965 specimens had been tested from 66,578,824 people using RT-PCR, TCM, and antigen rapid tests. There were 5,211 suspected cases.
 Indonesia confirmed 2,248 new cases – the most since 6 April 2022, bringing the total number to 6,088,460. 1,626 patients recovered, bringing the number to 5,914,933. 6 patients deceased, bringing the tally to 156,737. All 514 municipalities and regencies had reported at least one positive case.
 As of 18:00 WIB (UTC+7), 201,505,082 people had taken the first dose of vaccine, 169,019,757 had completed the second dose, and 50,579,814 had been inoculated with the third dose.

July
 1 July
 100,899,655 specimens had been tested from 66,634,679 people using RT-PCR, TCM, and antigen rapid tests. There were 5,714 suspected cases.
 Indonesia confirmed 2,049 new cases, bringing the total number to 6,090,509. 1,921 patients recovered – the most since 26 April 2022, bringing the number to 5,916,854. 3 patients deceased, bringing the tally to 156,740. All 514 municipalities and regencies had reported at least one positive case.
 As of 18:00 WIB (UTC+7), 201,536,360 people had taken the first dose of vaccine, 169,070,780 had completed the second dose, and 50,764,747 had been inoculated with the third dose.
 2 July
 100,899,655 specimens had been tested from 66,680,565 people using RT-PCR, TCM, and antigen rapid tests. There were 3,765 suspected cases.
 Indonesia confirmed 1,794 new cases, bringing the total number to 6,092,303. 1,789 patients recovered, bringing the number to 5,918,643. 5 patients deceased, bringing the tally to 156,745. All 514 municipalities and regencies had reported at least one positive case.
 As of 18:00 WIB (UTC+7), 201,556,722 people had taken the first dose of vaccine, 169,109,956 had completed the second dose, and 50,912,961 had been inoculated with the third dose.
 The number of active cases was stuck for the first time since 26 May 2022.
 3 July
 101,009,594 specimens had been tested from 66,711,973 people using RT-PCR, TCM, and antigen rapid tests. There were 2,486 suspected cases.
 Indonesia confirmed 1,614 new cases, bringing the total number to 6,093,917. 1,606 patients recovered, bringing the number to 5,920,249. 4 patients deceased, bringing the tally to 156,749. All 514 municipalities and regencies had reported at least one positive case.
 As of 18:00 WIB (UTC+7), 201,568,112 people had taken the first dose of vaccine, 169,136,897 had completed the second dose, and 51,016,689 had been inoculated with the third dose.
 4 July
 101,079,822 specimens had been tested from 66,757,211 people using RT-PCR, TCM, and antigen rapid tests. There were 3,215 suspected cases.
 Indonesia confirmed 1,434 new cases, bringing the total number to 6,095,351. 1,868 patients recovered, bringing the number to 5,922,117. 9 patients deceased, bringing the tally to 156,758. All 514 municipalities and regencies had reported at least one positive case.
 As of 18:00 WIB (UTC+7), 201,587,396 people had taken the first dose of vaccine, 169,164,398 had completed the second dose, and 51,118,893 had been inoculated with the third dose.
 5 July
 101,170,840 specimens had been tested from 66,823,952 people using RT-PCR, TCM, and antigen rapid tests. There were 4,995 suspected cases.
 Indonesia confirmed 2,577 new cases – the most since 1 April 2022, bringing the total number to 6,097,928. 1,691 patients recovered, bringing the number to 5,923,808. 8 patients deceased, bringing the tally to 156,766. All 514 municipalities and regencies had reported at least one positive case.
 As of 18:00 WIB (UTC+7), 201,614,069 people had taken the first dose of vaccine, 169,188,034 had completed the second dose, and 51,187,323 had been inoculated with the third dose.
 6 July
 101,250,215 specimens had been tested from 66,881,074 people using RT-PCR, TCM, and antigen rapid tests. There were 5,712 suspected cases.
 Indonesia confirmed 2,743 new cases – the most since 1 April 2022, bringing the total number to 6,100,671. 2,045 patients recovered – the most since 26 April 2022, bringing the number to 5,925,853. 4 patients deceased, bringing the tally to 156,770. All 514 municipalities and regencies had reported at least one positive case.
 As of 18:00 WIB (UTC+7), 201,641,466 people had taken the first dose of vaccine, 169,227,515 had completed the second dose, and 51,323,024 had been inoculated with the third dose.
 7 July
 101,326,722 specimens had been tested from 66,937,012 people using RT-PCR, TCM, and antigen rapid tests. There were 5,015 suspected cases.
 Indonesia confirmed 2,881 new cases – the most since 1 April 2022, bringing the total number to 6,103,552. 1,877 patients recovered, bringing the number to 5,927,730. 6 patients deceased, bringing the tally to 156,776. All 514 municipalities and regencies had reported at least one positive case.
 As of 18:00 WIB (UTC+7), 201,843,451 people had taken the first dose of vaccine, 169,261,875 had completed the second dose, and 51,310,244 – oddly reduced by 12,780 compared to 6 July – had been inoculated with the third dose.
 8 July
 101,398,629 specimens had been tested from 66,986,440 people using RT-PCR, TCM, and antigen rapid tests. There were 4,981 suspected cases.
 Indonesia confirmed 2,472 new cases, bringing the total number to 6,106,024. 2,386 patients recovered – the most since 26 April 2022, bringing the number to 5,930,116. 5 patients deceased, bringing the tally to 156,781. All 514 municipalities and regencies had reported at least one positive case.
 As of 18:00 WIB (UTC+7), 201,732,278 – oddly reduced by 111,173 compared to 7 July – people had taken the first dose of vaccine, 169,270,848 had completed the second dose, and 51,645,300 had been inoculated with the third dose.
 9 July
 101,453,673 specimens had been tested from 67,021,570 people using RT-PCR, TCM, and antigen rapid tests. There were 3,990 suspected cases.
 Indonesia confirmed 2,705 new cases, bringing the total number to 6,108,729. 1,973 patients recovered, bringing the number to 5,932,089. 4 patients deceased, bringing the tally to 156,785. All 514 municipalities and regencies had reported at least one positive case.
 As of 18:00 WIB (UTC+7), 201,722,613 – oddly reduced by 9,665 compared to 8 July – people had taken the first dose of vaccine, 169,322,878 had completed the second dose, and 51,780,655 had been inoculated with the third dose.
 10 July
 101,495,375 specimens had been tested from 67,051,883 people using RT-PCR, TCM, and antigen rapid tests. There were 2,246 suspected cases.
 Indonesia confirmed 2,576 new cases, bringing the total number to 6,111,305. 1,890 patients recovered, bringing the number to 5,933,979. 6 patients deceased, bringing the tally to 156,791. All 514 municipalities and regencies had reported at least one positive case.
 As of 18:00 WIB (UTC+7), 201,741,332 people had taken the first dose of vaccine, 169,352,223 had completed the second dose, and 51,942,130 had been inoculated with the third dose.
 11 July
 101,566,470 specimens had been tested from 67,105,063 people using RT-PCR, TCM, and antigen rapid tests. There were 3,398 suspected cases.
 Indonesia confirmed 1,681 new cases, bringing the total number to 6,112,986. 1,866 patients recovered, bringing the number to 5,935,845. 7 patients deceased, bringing the tally to 156,798. All 514 municipalities and regencies had reported at least one positive case.
 As of 18:00 WIB (UTC+7), 201,758,574 people had taken the first dose of vaccine, 169,370,984 had completed the second dose, and 52,023,187 had been inoculated with the third dose.
 12 July
 101,664,405 specimens had been tested from 67,177,423 people using RT-PCR, TCM, and antigen rapid tests. There were 5,340 suspected cases.
 Indonesia confirmed 3,361 new cases – the most since 30 March 2022, bringing the total number to 6,116,347. 1,780 patients recovered, bringing the number to 5,937,625. 8 patients deceased, bringing the tally to 156,806. All 514 municipalities and regencies had reported at least one positive case.
 As of 18:00 WIB (UTC+7), 201,794,383 people had taken the first dose of vaccine, 169,384,713 had completed the second dose, and 52,092,271 had been inoculated with the third dose.
 The number of active cases was increased by 1,573, the most since 26 February 2022.
 13 July
 101,753,259 specimens had been tested from 67,242,376 people using RT-PCR, TCM, and antigen rapid tests. There were 5,904 suspected cases.
 Indonesia confirmed 3,822 new cases – the most since 30 March 2022, bringing the total number to 6,120,169. 1,939 patients recovered, bringing the number to 5,939,564. 12 patients deceased – the joint-most since 30 May 2022, bringing the tally to 156,818. All 514 municipalities and regencies had reported at least one positive case.
 As of 18:00 WIB (UTC+7), 201,823,855 people had taken the first dose of vaccine, 169,416,133 had completed the second dose, and 52,238,307 had been inoculated with the third dose.
 The number of active cases was increased by 1,871, the most since 26 February 2022.
 14 July
 101,839,771 specimens had been tested from 67,305,135 people using RT-PCR, TCM, and antigen rapid tests. There were 5,645 suspected cases.
 Indonesia confirmed 3,584 new cases, bringing the total number to 6,123,753. 2,872 patients recovered – the most since 26 April 2022, bringing the number to 5,942,436. 9 patients deceased, bringing the tally to 156,827. All 514 municipalities and regencies had reported at least one positive case.
 As of 18:00 WIB (UTC+7), 201,868,006 people had taken the first dose of vaccine, 169,472,751 had completed the second dose, and 52,555,652 had been inoculated with the third dose.
 15 July
 101,923,188 specimens had been tested from 67,368,354 people using RT-PCR, TCM, and antigen rapid tests. There were 5,165 suspected cases.
 Indonesia confirmed 3,331 new cases, bringing the total number to 6,127,084. 2,842 patients recovered, bringing the number to 5,945,278. 6 patients deceased, bringing the tally to 156,833. All 514 municipalities and regencies had reported at least one positive case.
 As of 18:00 WIB (UTC+7), 201,898,750 people had taken the first dose of vaccine, 169,506,642 had completed the second dose, and 52,742,875 had been inoculated with the third dose.
 16 July
 102,007,984 specimens had been tested from 67,430,929 people using RT-PCR, TCM, and antigen rapid tests. There were 5,093 suspected cases.
 Indonesia confirmed 4,329 new cases – the most since 25 March 2022, bringing the total number to 6,131,413. 2,702 patients recovered, bringing the number to 5,947,980. 6 patients deceased, bringing the tally to 156,839. All 514 municipalities and regencies had reported at least one positive case.
 As of 18:00 WIB (UTC+7), 201,898,750 people had taken the first dose of vaccine, 169,506,642 had completed the second dose, and 52,742,875 had been inoculated with the third dose.
 17 July
 102,088,338 specimens had been tested from 67,491,777 people using RT-PCR, TCM, and antigen rapid tests. There were 2,992 suspected cases.
 Indonesia confirmed 3,540 new cases, bringing the total number to 6,134,953. 2,574 patients recovered, bringing the number to 5,950,554. 10 patients deceased, bringing the tally to 156,849. All 514 municipalities and regencies had reported at least one positive case.
 As of 18:00 WIB (UTC+7), 201,938,946 people had taken the first dose of vaccine, 169,559,880 had completed the second dose, and 53,057,897 had been inoculated with the third dose.
 18 July
 102,193,503 specimens had been tested from 67,569,247 people using RT-PCR, TCM, and antigen rapid tests. There were 3,832 suspected cases.
 Indonesia confirmed 3,393 new cases, bringing the total number to 6,138,346. 2,427 patients recovered, bringing the number to 5,952,981. 10 patients deceased, bringing the tally to 156,859. All 514 municipalities and regencies had reported at least one positive case.
 As of 18:00 WIB (UTC+7), 201,966,566 people had taken the first dose of vaccine, 169,577,898 had completed the second dose, and 53,131,608 had been inoculated with the third dose.
 19 July
 102,320,536 specimens had been tested from 67,656,963 people using RT-PCR, TCM, and antigen rapid tests. There were 6,355 suspected cases.
 Indonesia confirmed 5,085 new cases – the most since 24 March 2022, bringing the total number to 6,143,431. 2,596 patients recovered, bringing the number to 5,955,577. 6 patients deceased, bringing the tally to 156,865. All 514 municipalities and regencies had reported at least one positive case.
 As of 18:00 WIB (UTC+7), 202,007,159 people had taken the first dose of vaccine, 169,618,145 had completed the second dose, and 53,358,796 had been inoculated with the third dose.
 The number of active cases was increased by 2,483, the most since 26 February 2022.
 20 July
 102,439,442 specimens had been tested from 67,744,394 people using RT-PCR, TCM, and antigen rapid tests. There were 6,536 suspected cases.
 Indonesia confirmed 5,653 new cases – the most since 24 March 2022, bringing the total number to 6,149,084. 2,331 patients recovered, bringing the number to 5,957,908. 10 patients deceased, bringing the tally to 156,875. All 514 municipalities and regencies had reported at least one positive case.
 As of 18:00 WIB (UTC+7), 202,047,854 people had taken the first dose of vaccine, 169,663,166 had completed the second dose, and 53,621,369 had been inoculated with the third dose.
 The number of active cases was increased by 3,312, the most since 26 February 2022. The number of active cases was 36,781, the highest since 20 April 2022.
 21 July
 102,562,428 specimens had been tested from 67,834,506 people using RT-PCR, TCM, and antigen rapid tests. There were 6,200 suspected cases.
 Indonesia confirmed 5,410 new cases, bringing the total number to 6,154,494. 2,925 patients recovered – the most since 26 April 2022, bringing the number to 5,960,833. 5 patients deceased, bringing the tally to 156,880. All 514 municipalities and regencies had reported at least one positive case.
 As of 18:00 WIB (UTC+7), 202,094,999 people had taken the first dose of vaccine, 169,711,829 had completed the second dose, and 53,886,611 had been inoculated with the third dose.
 The number of active cases was 36,781, the highest since 20 April 2022.
 22 July
 102,675,218 specimens had been tested from 67,915,323 people using RT-PCR, TCM, and antigen rapid tests. There were 5,861 suspected cases.
 Indonesia confirmed 4,834 new cases, bringing the total number to 6,159,328. 3,363 patients recovered – the most since 26 April 2022, bringing the number to 5,964,196. 13 patients deceased – the most since 18 May 2022, bringing the tally to 156,893. All 514 municipalities and regencies had reported at least one positive case.
 As of 18:00 WIB (UTC+7), 202,136,019 people had taken the first dose of vaccine, 169,751,535 had completed the second dose, and 54,144,170 had been inoculated with the third dose.
 The number of active cases was 38,239, the highest since 20 April 2022.
 23 July
 102,779,858 specimens had been tested from 67,983,809 people using RT-PCR, TCM, and antigen rapid tests. There were 5,871 suspected cases.
 Indonesia confirmed 4,943 new cases, bringing the total number to 6,164,271. 4,108 patients recovered – the most since 26 April 2022, bringing the number to 5,968,304. 9 patients deceased, bringing the tally to 156,902. All 514 municipalities and regencies had reported at least one positive case.
 As of 18:00 WIB (UTC+7), 202,173,586 people had taken the first dose of vaccine, 169,786,997 had completed the second dose, and 54,383,875 had been inoculated with the third dose.
 The number of active cases was 39,065, the highest since 20 April 2022.
 24 July
 102,864,032 specimens had been tested from 68,041,459 people using RT-PCR, TCM, and antigen rapid tests. There were 3,546 suspected cases.
 Indonesia confirmed 4,071 new cases, bringing the total number to 6,168,342. 2,684 patients recovered, bringing the number to 5,970,988. No patients deceased – the first time since 17 March 2020, bringing the tally to 156,902. All 514 municipalities and regencies had reported at least one positive case.
 As of 18:00 WIB (UTC+7), 202,194,190 people had taken the first dose of vaccine, 169,813,044 had completed the second dose, and 54,573,626 had been inoculated with the third dose.
 The number of active cases was 40,452, the highest since 20 April 2022.
 25 July
 102,974,551 specimens had been tested from 68,119,477 people using RT-PCR, TCM, and antigen rapid tests. There were 3,980 suspected cases.
 Indonesia confirmed 4,048 new cases, bringing the total number to 6,172,390. 4,023 patients recovered, bringing the number to 5,975,011. 14 patients deceased, bringing the tally to 156,916. All 514 municipalities and regencies had reported at least one positive case.
 As of 18:00 WIB (UTC+7), 202,212,156 people had taken the first dose of vaccine, 169,831,197 had completed the second dose, and 54,672,429 had been inoculated with the third dose.
 The number of active cases was 40,463, the highest since 20 April 2022.
 26 July
 103,116,512 specimens had been tested from 68,222,719 people using RT-PCR, TCM, and antigen rapid tests. There were 7,071 suspected cases.
 Indonesia confirmed 6,483 new cases – the most since 22 March 2022, bringing the total number to 6,178,873. 3,511 patients recovered, bringing the number to 5,978,522. 13 patients deceased, bringing the tally to 156,929. All 514 municipalities and regencies had reported at least one positive case.
 As of 18:00 WIB (UTC+7), 202,260,136 people had taken the first dose of vaccine, 169,874,774 had completed the second dose, and 54,937,513 had been inoculated with the third dose.
 The number of active cases was 43,422, the highest since 20 April 2022.
 27 July
 103,240,858 specimens had been tested from 68,284,570 people using RT-PCR, TCM, and antigen rapid tests. There were 6,899 suspected cases.
 Indonesia confirmed 6,438 new cases, bringing the total number to 6,185,311. 3,825 patients recovered, bringing the number to 5,982,347. 11 patients deceased, bringing the tally to 156,940. All 514 municipalities and regencies had reported at least one positive case.
 As of 18:00 WIB (UTC+7), 202,336,782 people had taken the first dose of vaccine, 169,934,868 had completed the second dose, and 55,290,334 had been inoculated with the third dose.
 The number of active cases was 46,024, the highest since 19 April 2022.
 28 July
 103,363,087 specimens had been tested from 68,339,729 people using RT-PCR, TCM, and antigen rapid tests. There were 7,267 suspected cases.
 Indonesia confirmed 6,353 new cases, bringing the total number to 6,191,664. 5,705 patients recovered – the most since 22 April 2022, bringing the number to 5,988,052. 17 patients deceased, bringing the tally to 156,957. All 514 municipalities and regencies had reported at least one positive case.
 As of 18:00 WIB (UTC+7), 202,380,289 people had taken the first dose of vaccine, 169,972,729 had completed the second dose, and 55,491,778 had been inoculated with the third dose.
 The number of active cases was 46,655, the highest since 19 April 2022.
 29 July
 103,472,603 specimens had been tested from 68,391,471 people using RT-PCR, TCM, and antigen rapid tests. There were 6,418 suspected cases.
 Indonesia confirmed 5,831 new cases, bringing the total number to 6,197,495. 4,485 patients recovered, bringing the number to 5,992,537. 13 patients deceased, bringing the tally to 156,970. All 514 municipalities and regencies had reported at least one positive case.
 As of 18:00 WIB (UTC+7), 202,434,619 people had taken the first dose of vaccine, 170,028,083 had completed the second dose, and 55,831,344 had been inoculated with the third dose.
 The number of active cases was 47,988, the highest since 19 April 2022.
 30 July
 103,563,868 specimens had been tested from 68,434,872 people using RT-PCR, TCM, and antigen rapid tests. There were 5,197 suspected cases.
 Indonesia confirmed 5,398 new cases, bringing the total number to 6,202,893. 4,268 patients recovered, bringing the number to 5,996,805. 13 patients deceased, bringing the tally to 156,983. All 514 municipalities and regencies had reported at least one positive case.
 As of 18:00 WIB (UTC+7), 202,434,619 people had taken the first dose of vaccine, 170,028,083 had completed the second dose, and 55,831,344 had been inoculated with the third dose.
 The number of active cases was 49,105, the highest since 18 April 2022.
 31 July
 103,638,507 specimens had been tested from 68,470,098 people using RT-PCR, TCM, and antigen rapid tests. There were 3,502 suspected cases.
 Indonesia confirmed 4,205 new cases, bringing the total number to 6,207,098. 4,597 patients recovered, bringing the number to 6,001,402. 10 patients deceased, bringing the tally to 156,993. All 514 municipalities and regencies had reported at least one positive case.
 As of 18:00 WIB (UTC+7), 202,477,075 people had taken the first dose of vaccine, 170,076,790 had completed the second dose, and 56,120,354 had been inoculated with the third dose.

August
 1 August
 103,751,537 specimens had been tested from 68,521,956 people using RT-PCR, TCM, and antigen rapid tests. There were 5,092 suspected cases.
 Indonesia confirmed 3,696 new cases, bringing the total number to 6,210,794. 4,579 patients recovered, bringing the number to 6,005,981. 11 patients deceased, bringing the tally to 157,004. All 514 municipalities and regencies had reported at least one positive case.
 As of 18:00 (UTC+7), 202,477,075 people had taken the first dose of vaccine, 170,076,790 had completed the second dose, and 56,120,354 had been inoculated with the third dose.
 2 August
 103,884,748 specimens had been tested from 68,584,800 people using RT-PCR, TCM, and antigen rapid tests. There were 7,264 suspected cases.
 Indonesia confirmed 5,827 new cases, bringing the total number to 6,216,621. 4,564 patients recovered, bringing the number to 6,010,545. 24 patients deceased – the most since 27 April 2022, bringing the tally to 157,028. All 514 municipalities and regencies had reported at least one positive case.
 As of 18:00 (UTC+7), 202,554,796 people had taken the first dose of vaccine, 170,135,767 had completed the second dose, and 56,445,019 had been inoculated with the third dose.
 3 August
 104,006,284 specimens had been tested from 68,644,962 people using RT-PCR, TCM, and antigen rapid tests. There were 7,595 suspected cases.
 Indonesia confirmed 6,167 new cases, bringing the total number to 6,222,788. 4,340 patients recovered, bringing the number to 6,014,885. 18 patients deceased, bringing the tally to 157,046. All 514 municipalities and regencies had reported at least one positive case.
 As of 18:00 (UTC+7), 202,603,974 people had taken the first dose of vaccine, 170,175,475 had completed the second dose, and 56,681,378 had been inoculated with the third dose.
 The number of active cases was 50,857, the highest since 18 April 2022.
 4 August
 104,132,040 specimens had been tested from 68,705,897 people using RT-PCR, TCM, and antigen rapid tests. There were 7,222 suspected cases.
 Indonesia confirmed 6,527 new cases – the most since 22 March 2022, bringing the total number to 6,229,315. 6,664 patients recovered – the most since 22 April 2022, bringing the number to 6,021,549. 14 patients deceased, bringing the tally to 157,060. All 514 municipalities and regencies had reported at least one positive case.
 As of 18:00 (UTC+7), 202,614,792 people had taken the first dose of vaccine, 170,194,037 had completed the second dose, and 56,824,634 had been inoculated with the third dose.
 5 August
 104,244,259 specimens had been tested from 68,761,242 people using RT-PCR, TCM, and antigen rapid tests. There were 6,237 suspected cases.
 Indonesia confirmed 5,929 new cases, bringing the total number to 6,235,244. 6,323 patients recovered, bringing the number to 6,027,872. 12 patients deceased, bringing the tally to 157,072. All 514 municipalities and regencies had reported at least one positive case.
 As of 18:00 (UTC+7), 202,678,905 people had taken the first dose of vaccine, 170,243,066 had completed the second dose, and 57,118,698 had been inoculated with the third dose.
 6 August
 104,347,059 specimens had been tested from 68,811,162 people using RT-PCR, TCM, and antigen rapid tests. There were 6,219 suspected cases.
 Indonesia confirmed 5,455 new cases, bringing the total number to 6,240,699. 4,850 patients recovered, bringing the number to 6,032,722. 10 patients deceased, bringing the tally to 157,082. All 514 municipalities and regencies had reported at least one positive case.
 As of 18:00 (UTC+7), 202,714,381 people had taken the first dose of vaccine, 170,274,300 had completed the second dose, and 57,312,670 had been inoculated with the third dose.
 The number of active cases was 50,895, the highest since 18 April 2022.
 7 August
 104,428,974 specimens had been tested from 68,847,199 people using RT-PCR, TCM, and antigen rapid tests. There were 4,160 suspected cases.
 Indonesia confirmed 4,279 new cases, bringing the total number to 6,244,978. 5,016 patients recovered, bringing the number to 6,037,738. 13 patients deceased, bringing the tally to 157,095. All 514 municipalities and regencies had reported at least one positive case.
 As of 18:00 (UTC+7), 202,731,677 people had taken the first dose of vaccine, 170,293,850 had completed the second dose, and 57,451,610 had been inoculated with the third dose.
 8 August
 104,536,662 specimens had been tested from 68,892,564 people using RT-PCR, TCM, and antigen rapid tests. There were 4,505 suspected cases.
 Indonesia confirmed 4,425 new cases, bringing the total number to 6,249,403. 4,919 patients recovered, bringing the number to 6,042,657. 18 patients deceased, bringing the tally to 157,113. All 514 municipalities and regencies had reported at least one positive case.
 As of 18:00 (UTC+7), 202,763,420 people had taken the first dose of vaccine, 170,314,651 had completed the second dose, and 57,548,747 had been inoculated with the third dose.
 9 August
 104,665,165 specimens had been tested from 68,950,349 people using RT-PCR, TCM, and antigen rapid tests. There were 7,071 suspected cases.
 Indonesia confirmed 6,276 new cases, bringing the total number to 6,255,679. 4,850 patients recovered, bringing the number to 6,047,507. 18 patients deceased, bringing the tally to 157,131. All 514 municipalities and regencies had reported at least one positive case.
 As of 18:00 (UTC+7), 202,804,721 people had taken the first dose of vaccine, 170,348,837 had completed the second dose, and 57,740,849 had been inoculated with the third dose.
 The number of active cases was 51,041, the highest since 17 April 2022.
 10 August
 104,787,074 specimens had been tested from 69,005,931 people using RT-PCR, TCM, and antigen rapid tests. There were 7,985 suspected cases.
 Indonesia confirmed 5,926 new cases, bringing the total number to 6,261,605. 4,906 patients recovered, bringing the number to 6,052,413. 18 patients deceased, bringing the tally to 157,149. All 514 municipalities and regencies had reported at least one positive case.
 As of 18:00 (UTC+7), 202,841,745 people had taken the first dose of vaccine, 170,392,604 had completed the second dose, and 57,980,364 had been inoculated with the third dose.
 The number of active cases was 52,043, the highest since 17 April 2022.
 11 August
 104,910,593 specimens had been tested from 69,060,425 people using RT-PCR, TCM, and antigen rapid tests. There were 7,397 suspected cases.
 Indonesia confirmed 5,532 new cases, bringing the total number to 6,267,137. 4,824 patients recovered, bringing the number to 6,057,237. 22 patients deceased, bringing the tally to 157,171. All 514 municipalities and regencies had reported at least one positive case.
 As of 18:00 (UTC+7), 202,883,302 people had taken the first dose of vaccine, 170,425,034 had completed the second dose, and 58,213,949 had been inoculated with the third dose. For the first time the number of fourth dose was reported; 248,784 health professionals had received the second booster shot.
 The number of active cases was 52,729, the highest since 17 April 2022.
 12 August
 105,029,539 specimens had been tested from 69,112,385 people using RT-PCR, TCM, and antigen rapid tests. There were 7,050 suspected cases.
 Indonesia confirmed 6,091 new cases, bringing the total number to 6,273,228. 5,226 patients recovered, bringing the number to 6,062,463. 18 patients deceased, bringing the tally to 157,189. All 514 municipalities and regencies had reported at least one positive case.
 As of 18:00 (UTC+7), 202,916,233 people had taken the first dose of vaccine, 170,454,782 had completed the second dose, and 58,396,768 had been inoculated with the third dose.
 The number of active cases was 53,576, the highest since 17 April 2022.
 13 August
 105,126,271 specimens had been tested from 69,152,606 people using RT-PCR, TCM, and antigen rapid tests. There were 6,972 suspected cases.
 Indonesia confirmed 5,104 new cases, bringing the total number to 6,278,332. 5,055 patients recovered, bringing the number to 6,067,518. 19 patients deceased, bringing the tally to 157,208. All 514 municipalities and regencies had reported at least one positive case.
 As of 18:00 (UTC+7), 202,943,244 people had taken the first dose of vaccine, 170,479,143 had completed the second dose, and 58,540,315 had been inoculated with the third dose. 266,619 health professionals had received the second booster shot.
 The number of active cases was 53,606, the highest since 17 April 2022.
 14 August
 105,201,993 specimens had been tested from 69,184,089 people using RT-PCR, TCM, and antigen rapid tests. There were 4,345 suspected cases.
 Indonesia confirmed 4,442 new cases, bringing the total number to 6,282,774. 4,903 patients recovered, bringing the number to 6,072,421. 18 patients deceased, bringing the tally to 157,226. All 514 municipalities and regencies had reported at least one positive case.
 As of 18:00 (UTC+7), 202,957,976 people had taken the first dose of vaccine, 170,493,929 had completed the second dose, and 58,637,933 had been inoculated with the third dose. 267,816 health professionals had received the second booster shot.
 15 August
 105,302,298 specimens had been tested from 69,224,242 people using RT-PCR, TCM, and antigen rapid tests. There were 4,339 suspected cases.
 Indonesia confirmed 3,588 new cases, bringing the total number to 6,286,362. 4,508 patients recovered, bringing the number to 6,076,929. 26 patients deceased – the most since 27 April 2022, bringing the tally to 157,252. All 514 municipalities and regencies had reported at least one positive case.
 As of 18:00 (UTC+7), 202,983,055 people had taken the first dose of vaccine, 170,512,322 had completed the second dose, and 58,733,382 had been inoculated with the third dose. 269,174 health professionals had received the second booster shot.
 The number of active cases was decreased by 946, the most since 26 April 2022.
 16 August
 105,414,707 specimens had been tested from 69,273,689 people using RT-PCR, TCM, and antigen rapid tests. There were 7,015 suspected cases.
 Indonesia confirmed 5,869 new cases, bringing the total number to 6,292,231. 5,803 patients recovered, bringing the number to 6,082,732. 25 patients deceased, bringing the tally to 157,277. All 514 municipalities and regencies had reported at least one positive case.
 As of 18:00 (UTC+7), 203,019,000 people had taken the first dose of vaccine, 170,542,055 had completed the second dose, and 58,898,750 had been inoculated with the third dose. 271,246 health professionals had received the second booster shot.
 17 August
 105,499,887 specimens had been tested from 69,311,793 people using RT-PCR, TCM, and antigen rapid tests. There were 5,163 suspected cases.
 Indonesia confirmed 5,253 new cases, bringing the total number to 6,297,484. 4,324 patients recovered, bringing the number to 6,087,056. 19 patients deceased, bringing the tally to 157,296. All 514 municipalities and regencies had reported at least one positive case.
 As of 18:00 (UTC+7), 203,029,286 people had taken the first dose of vaccine, 170,550,632 had completed the second dose, and 58,924,567 had been inoculated with the third dose. 271,379 health professionals had received the second booster shot.
 18 August
 105,581,584 specimens had been tested from 69,347,118 people using RT-PCR, TCM, and antigen rapid tests. There were 4,680 suspected cases.
 Indonesia confirmed 4,039 new cases, bringing the total number to 6,301,523. 5,250 patients recovered, bringing the number to 6,092,306. 21 patients deceased, bringing the tally to 157,317. All 514 municipalities and regencies had reported at least one positive case.
 As of 18:00 (UTC+7), 203,054,380 people had taken the first dose of vaccine, 170,568,947 had completed the second dose, and 58,992,319 had been inoculated with the third dose. 272,243 health professionals had received the second booster shot.
 19 August
 105,681,997 specimens had been tested from 69,394,970 people using RT-PCR, TCM, and antigen rapid tests. There were 5,867 suspected cases.
 Indonesia confirmed 5,163 new cases, bringing the total number to 6,306,686. 5,028 patients recovered, bringing the number to 6,097,334. 26 patients deceased – the joint-most since 27 April 2022, bringing the tally to 157,343. All 514 municipalities and regencies had reported at least one positive case.
 As of 18:00 (UTC+7), 203,085,688 people had taken the first dose of vaccine, 170,589,745 had completed the second dose, and 59,076,053 had been inoculated with the third dose. 273,135 health professionals had received the second booster shot.
 20 August
 105,765,132 specimens had been tested from 69,432,980 people using RT-PCR, TCM, and antigen rapid tests. There were 6,092 suspected cases.
 Indonesia confirmed 4,922 new cases, bringing the total number to 6,311,608. 4,302 patients recovered, bringing the number to 6,101,636. 22 patients deceased, bringing the tally to 157,365. All 514 municipalities and regencies had reported at least one positive case.
 As of 18:00 (UTC+7), 203,107,414 people had taken the first dose of vaccine, 170,606,659 had completed the second dose, and 59,140,820 had been inoculated with the third dose. 276,385 health professionals had received the second booster shot.
 21 August
 105,829,381 specimens had been tested from 69,462,720 people using RT-PCR, TCM, and antigen rapid tests. There were 3,472 suspected cases.
 Indonesia confirmed 3,949 new cases, bringing the total number to 6,315,557. 6,044 patients recovered, bringing the number to 6,107,680. 12 patients deceased, bringing the tally to 157,377. All 514 municipalities and regencies had reported at least one positive case.
 As of 18:00 (UTC+7), 203,107,414 people had taken the first dose of vaccine, 170,606,659 had completed the second dose, and 59,140,820 had been inoculated with the third dose. 276,385 health professionals had received the second booster shot.
 22 August
 105,920,916 specimens had been tested from 69,504,051 people using RT-PCR, TCM, and antigen rapid tests. There were 3,618 suspected cases.
 Indonesia confirmed 3,300 new cases, bringing the total number to 6,318,857. 4,978 patients recovered, bringing the number to 6,112,658. 19 patients deceased, bringing the tally to 157,396. All 514 municipalities and regencies had reported at least one positive case.
 As of 18:00 (UTC+7), 203,117,858 people had taken the first dose of vaccine, 170,614,343 had completed the second dose, and 59,168,169 had been inoculated with the third dose. 277,258 health professionals had received the second booster shot.
 23 August
 106,033,887 specimens had been tested from 69,555,544 people using RT-PCR, TCM, and antigen rapid tests. There were 6,793 suspected cases.
 Indonesia confirmed 4,858 new cases, bringing the total number to 6,323,715. 5,134 patients recovered, bringing the number to 6,117,792. 24 patients deceased, bringing the tally to 157,420. All 514 municipalities and regencies had reported at least one positive case.
 As of 18:00 (UTC+7), 203,152,479 people had taken the first dose of vaccine, 170,743,483 had completed the second dose, and 59,713,355 had been inoculated with the third dose. 279,574 health professionals had received the second booster shot.
 24 August
 106,136,104 specimens had been tested from 69,601,651 people using RT-PCR, TCM, and antigen rapid tests. There were 6,687 suspected cases.
 Indonesia confirmed 5,428 new cases, bringing the total number to 6,329,143. 5,550 patients recovered, bringing the number to 6,123,342. 18 patients deceased, bringing the tally to 157,438. All 514 municipalities and regencies had reported at least one positive case.
 As of 18:00 (UTC+7), 203,176,630 people had taken the first dose of vaccine, 170,777,955 had completed the second dose, and 59,850,267 had been inoculated with the third dose. 280,765 health professionals had received the second booster shot.
 25 August
 106,235,330 specimens had been tested from 69,646,534 people using RT-PCR, TCM, and antigen rapid tests. There were 6,387 suspected cases.
 Indonesia confirmed 5,214 new cases, bringing the total number to 6,334,357. 5,780 patients recovered, bringing the number to 6,129,122. 19 patients deceased, bringing the tally to 157,457. All 514 municipalities and regencies had reported at least one positive case.
 As of 18:00 (UTC+7), 203,212,665 people had taken the first dose of vaccine, 170,810,513 had completed the second dose, and 59,999,316 had been inoculated with the third dose. 282,015 health professionals had received the second booster shot.
 26 August
 106,324,594 specimens had been tested from 69,686,338 people using RT-PCR, TCM, and antigen rapid tests. There were 5,952 suspected cases.
 Indonesia confirmed 4,549 new cases, bringing the total number to 6,338,906. 5,758 patients recovered, bringing the number to 6,134,880. 21 patients deceased, bringing the tally to 157,478. All 514 municipalities and regencies had reported at least one positive case.
 As of 18:00 (UTC+7), 203,239,991 people had taken the first dose of vaccine, 170,836,026 had completed the second dose, and 60,121,328 had been inoculated with the third dose. 283,081 health professionals had received the second booster shot.
 27 August
 106,406,169 specimens had been tested from 69,724,140 people using RT-PCR, TCM, and antigen rapid tests. There were 6,021 suspected cases.
 Indonesia confirmed 4,170 new cases, bringing the total number to 6,343,076. 2,514 patients recovered – the lowest since 20 July 2022, bringing the number to 6,137,394. 15 patients deceased, bringing the tally to 157,493. All 514 municipalities and regencies had reported at least one positive case.
 As of 18:00 (UTC+7), 203,267,387 people had taken the first dose of vaccine, 170,857,713 had completed the second dose, and 60,223,855 had been inoculated with the third dose. 284,073 health professionals had received the second booster shot.
 28 August
 106,464,732 specimens had been tested from 69,753,165 people using RT-PCR, TCM, and antigen rapid tests. There were 3,184 suspected cases.
 Indonesia confirmed 3,228 new cases – the lowest since 11 July 2022, bringing the total number to 6,346,304. 5,044 patients recovered, bringing the number to 6,142,438. 7 patients deceased – the lowest since 24 July 2022, bringing the tally to 157,500. All 514 municipalities and regencies had reported at least one positive case.
 As of 18:00 (UTC+7), 203,281,213 people had taken the first dose of vaccine, 170,873,055 had completed the second dose, and 60,309,735 had been inoculated with the third dose. 284,800 health professionals had received the second booster shot.
 29 August
 106,546,452 specimens had been tested from 69,789,211 people using RT-PCR, TCM, and antigen rapid tests. There were 4,138 suspected cases.
 Indonesia confirmed 2,871 new cases – the lowest since 11 July 2022, bringing the total number to 6,349,175. 4,702 patients recovered, bringing the number to 6,147,140. 21 patients deceased, bringing the tally to 157,521. All 514 municipalities and regencies had reported at least one positive case.
 As of 18:00 (UTC+7), 203,305,953 people had taken the first dose of vaccine, 170,887,677 had completed the second dose, and 60,364,935 had been inoculated with the third dose. 285,027 health professionals had received the second booster shot.
 30 August
 106,645,001 specimens had been tested from 69,834,922 people using RT-PCR, TCM, and antigen rapid tests. There were 8,051 suspected cases.
 Indonesia confirmed 5,070 new cases, bringing the total number to 6,354,245. 4,510 patients recovered, bringing the number to 6,151,650. 20 patients deceased, bringing the tally to 157,541. All 514 municipalities and regencies had reported at least one positive case.
 As of 18:00 (UTC+7), 203,342,902 people had taken the first dose of vaccine, 170,915,212 had completed the second dose, and 60,502,237 had been inoculated with the third dose. 296,137 health professionals had received the second booster shot.
 31 August
 106,732,670 specimens had been tested from 69,877,028 people using RT-PCR, TCM, and antigen rapid tests. There were 6,083 suspected cases.
 Indonesia confirmed 4,563 new cases, bringing the total number to 6,358,808. 4,384 patients recovered, bringing the number to 6,156,034. 25 patients deceased, bringing the tally to 157,566. All 514 municipalities and regencies had reported at least one positive case.
 As of 18:00 (UTC+7), 203,364,799 people had taken the first dose of vaccine, 170,959,189 had completed the second dose, and 60,643,700 had been inoculated with the third dose. 328,026 health professionals had received the second booster shot.

September
 1 September
 106,819,620 specimens had been tested from 69,918,530 people using RT-PCR, TCM, and antigen rapid tests. There were 5,881 suspected cases.
 Indonesia confirmed 4,094 new cases, bringing the total number to 6,362,902. 4,843 patients recovered, bringing the number to 6,160,877. 25 patients deceased, bringing the tally to 157,591. All 514 municipalities and regencies had reported at least one positive case.
 As of 18:00 (UTC+7), 203,360,329 people had taken the first dose of vaccine – oddly reduced by 4,470, 171,028,536 had completed the second dose, and 60,780,526 had been inoculated with the third dose. 356,566 health professionals had received the second booster shot.
 2 September
 106,896,133 specimens had been tested from 69,954,540 people using RT-PCR, TCM, and antigen rapid tests. There were 5,380 suspected cases.
 Indonesia confirmed 3,616 new cases, bringing the total number to 6,366,518. 4,451 patients recovered, bringing the number to 6,165,328. 17 patients deceased, bringing the tally to 157,608. All 514 municipalities and regencies had reported at least one positive case.
 As of 18:00 (UTC+7), 203,380,976 people had taken the first dose of vaccine, 171,053,097 had completed the second dose, and 60,894,826 had been inoculated with the third dose. 377,690 health professionals had received the second booster shot.
 3 September
 106,959,748 specimens had been tested from 69,984,104 people using RT-PCR, TCM, and antigen rapid tests. There were 4,799 suspected cases.
 Indonesia confirmed 3,260 new cases, bringing the total number to 6,369,778. 4,002 patients recovered, bringing the number to 6,169,330. 23 patients deceased, bringing the tally to 157,631. All 514 municipalities and regencies had reported at least one positive case.
 As of 18:00 (UTC+7), 203,408,930 people had taken the first dose of vaccine, 171,080,153 had completed the second dose, and 61,006,925 had been inoculated with the third dose. 401,979 health professionals had received the second booster shot.
 4 September
 107,008,442 specimens had been tested from 70,006,548 people using RT-PCR, TCM, and antigen rapid tests. There were 2,715 suspected cases.
 Indonesia confirmed 2,764 new cases – the lowest since 11 July 2022, bringing the total number to 6,372,542. 3,751 patients recovered, bringing the number to 6,173,081. 16 patients deceased, bringing the tally to 157,647. All 514 municipalities and regencies had reported at least one positive case.
 As of 18:00 (UTC+7), 203,408,930 people had taken the first dose of vaccine, 171,080,153 had completed the second dose, and 61,006,925 had been inoculated with the third dose. 401,979 health professionals had received the second booster shot.
 5 September
 107,081,078 specimens had been tested from 70,038,495 people using RT-PCR, TCM, and antigen rapid tests. There were 3,427 suspected cases.
 Indonesia confirmed 2,340 new cases – the lowest since 11 July 2022, bringing the total number to 6,374,882. 4,444 patients recovered, bringing the number to 6,177,525. 21 patients deceased, bringing the tally to 157,668. All 514 municipalities and regencies had reported at least one positive case.
 As of 18:00 (UTC+7), 203,426,778 people had taken the first dose of vaccine, 171,104,363 had completed the second dose, and 61,131,240 had been inoculated with the third dose. 417,323 health professionals had received the second booster shot.
 6 September
 107,171,995 specimens had been tested from 70,077,415 people using RT-PCR, TCM, and antigen rapid tests. There were 5,455 suspected cases.
 Indonesia confirmed 3,607 new cases, bringing the total number to 6,378,489. 5,136 patients recovered, bringing the number to 6,182,661. 28 patients deceased, bringing the tally to 157,696. All 514 municipalities and regencies had reported at least one positive case.
 As of 18:00 (UTC+7), 203,426,778 people had taken the first dose of vaccine, 171,104,363 had completed the second dose, and 61,131,240 had been inoculated with the third dose. 417,323 health professionals had received the second booster shot.
 7 September
 107,252,227 specimens had been tested from 70,114,533 people using RT-PCR, TCM, and antigen rapid tests. There were 5,874 suspected cases.
 Indonesia confirmed 3,513 new cases, bringing the total number to 6,382,002. 3,505 patients recovered, bringing the number to 6,186,166. 21 patients deceased, bringing the tally to 157,717. All 514 municipalities and regencies had reported at least one positive case.
 As of 18:00 (UTC+7), 203,426,778 people had taken the first dose of vaccine, 171,104,363 had completed the second dose, and 61,131,240 had been inoculated with the third dose. 417,323 health professionals had received the second booster shot. The numbers were same for three straight days for the first time ever.
 8 September
 107,329,264 specimens had been tested from 70,145,523 people using RT-PCR, TCM, and antigen rapid tests. There were 5,138 suspected cases.
 Indonesia confirmed 3,138 new cases, bringing the total number to 6,385,140. 3,441 patients recovered, bringing the number to 6,189,607. 12 patients deceased, bringing the tally to 157,729. All 514 municipalities and regencies had reported at least one positive case.
 As of 18:00 (UTC+7), 203,426,778 people had taken the first dose of vaccine, 171,104,363 had completed the second dose, and 61,131,240 had been inoculated with the third dose. 417,323 health professionals had received the second booster shot. The numbers were same for four straight days for the first time ever.
 9 September
 107,398,366 specimens had been tested from 70,176,673 people using RT-PCR, TCM, and antigen rapid tests. There were 5,038 suspected cases.
 Indonesia confirmed 2,804 new cases, bringing the total number to 6,387,944. 5,346 patients recovered, bringing the number to 6,194,953. 12 patients deceased, bringing the tally to 157,741. All 514 municipalities and regencies had reported at least one positive case.
 As of 18:00 (UTC+7), 203,426,778 people had taken the first dose of vaccine, 171,104,363 had completed the second dose, and 61,131,240 had been inoculated with the third dose. 417,323 health professionals had received the second booster shot. The numbers were same for five straight days for the first time ever.
 10 September
 107,455,417 specimens had been tested from 70,201,218 people using RT-PCR, TCM, and antigen rapid tests. There were 4,273 suspected cases.
 Indonesia confirmed 2,609 new cases, bringing the total number to 6,390,553. 3,098 patients recovered, bringing the number to 6,198,051. 16 patients deceased, bringing the tally to 157,757. All 514 municipalities and regencies had reported at least one positive case.
 As of 18:00 (UTC+7), 203,426,778 people had taken the first dose of vaccine, 171,104,363 had completed the second dose, and 61,131,240 had been inoculated with the third dose. 417,323 health professionals had received the second booster shot. The numbers were same for six straight days for the first time ever.
 11 September
 107,498,588 specimens had been tested from 70,218,644 people using RT-PCR, TCM, and antigen rapid tests. There were 2,288 suspected cases.
 Indonesia confirmed 1,939 new cases – the lowest since 11 July 2022, bringing the total number to 6,392,492. 2,725 patients recovered, bringing the number to 6,200,776. 13 patients deceased, bringing the tally to 157,770. All 514 municipalities and regencies had reported at least one positive case.
 As of 18:00 (UTC+7), 203,426,778 people had taken the first dose of vaccine, 171,104,363 had completed the second dose, and 61,131,240 had been inoculated with the third dose. 417,323 health professionals had received the second booster shot. The numbers were same for seven straight days for the first time ever.
 12 September
 107,562,459 specimens had been tested from 70,246,447 people using RT-PCR, TCM, and antigen rapid tests. There were 3,067 suspected cases.
 Indonesia confirmed 1,848 new cases – the lowest since 11 July 2022, bringing the total number to 6,394,340. 3,465 patients recovered, bringing the number to 6,204,241. 17 patients deceased, bringing the tally to 157,787. All 514 municipalities and regencies had reported at least one positive case.
 As of 18:00 (UTC+7), 204,153,837 people had taken the first dose of vaccine, 170,765,389 had completed the second dose – oddly reduced by 338,974, and 61,868,846 had been inoculated with the third dose. 491,622 health professionals had received the second booster shot.
 13 September
 107,642,398 specimens had been tested from 70,284,573 people using RT-PCR, TCM, and antigen rapid tests. There were 4,817 suspected cases.
 Indonesia confirmed 2,896 new cases, bringing the total number to 6,397,236. 3,617 patients recovered, bringing the number to 6,207,858. 20 patients deceased, bringing the tally to 157,807. All 514 municipalities and regencies had reported at least one positive case.
 As of 18:00 (UTC+7), 204,201,978 people had taken the first dose of vaccine, 170,814,589 had completed the second dose, and 62,086,712 had been inoculated with the third dose. 508,222 health professionals had received the second booster shot.
 14 September
 107,716,925 specimens had been tested from 70,321,003 people using RT-PCR, TCM, and antigen rapid tests. There were 4,775 suspected cases.
 Indonesia confirmed 2,799 new cases, bringing the total number to 6,400,035. 3,938 patients recovered, bringing the number to 6,211,796. 21 patients deceased, bringing the tally to 157,828. All 514 municipalities and regencies had reported at least one positive case.
 As of 18:00 (UTC+7), 204,223,897 people had taken the first dose of vaccine, 170,835,763 had completed the second dose, and 62,169,399 had been inoculated with the third dose. 515,178 health professionals had received the second booster shot.
 15 September
 107,785,960 specimens had been tested from 70,354,778 people using RT-PCR, TCM, and antigen rapid tests. There were 5,101 suspected cases.
 Indonesia confirmed 2,651 new cases, bringing the total number to 6,402,686. 3,915 patients recovered, bringing the number to 6,215,711. 21 patients deceased, bringing the tally to 157,849. All 514 municipalities and regencies had reported at least one positive case.
 As of 18:00 (UTC+7), 204,243,363 people had taken the first dose of vaccine, 170,855,051 had completed the second dose, and 62,246,432 had been inoculated with the third dose. 522,033 health professionals had received the second booster shot.
 16 September
 107,849,082 specimens had been tested from 70,387,017 people using RT-PCR, TCM, and antigen rapid tests. There were 4,497 suspected cases.
 Indonesia confirmed 2,358 new cases, bringing the total number to 6,405,044. 2,997 patients recovered, bringing the number to 6,218,708. 27 patients deceased, bringing the tally to 157,876. All 514 municipalities and regencies had reported at least one positive case.
 As of 17:16 (UTC+7), 204,275,017 people had taken the first dose of vaccine, 170,884,683 had completed the second dose, and 62,401,257 had been inoculated with the third dose. 536,734 health professionals had received the second booster shot.
 17 September
 107,902,204 specimens had been tested from 70,413,715 people using RT-PCR, TCM, and antigen rapid tests. There were 3,924 suspected cases.
 Indonesia confirmed 2,079 new cases, bringing the total number to 6,407,123. 2,681 patients recovered, bringing the number to 6,221,389. 8 patients deceased, bringing the tally to 157,884. All 514 municipalities and regencies had reported at least one positive case.
 As of 16:45 (UTC+7), 204,309,330 people had taken the first dose of vaccine, 170,917,344 had completed the second dose, and 62,565,548 had been inoculated with the third dose. 548,980 health professionals had received the second booster shot.
 18 September
 107,942,059 specimens had been tested from 70,433,316 people using RT-PCR, TCM, and antigen rapid tests. There were 2,371 suspected cases.
 Indonesia confirmed 1,693 new cases – the lowest since 11 July 2022, bringing the total number to 6,408,806. 1,667 patients recovered, bringing the number to 6,223,056. 8 patients deceased, bringing the tally to 157,892. All 514 municipalities and regencies had reported at least one positive case.
 As of 18:26 (UTC+7), 204,316,975 people had taken the first dose of vaccine, 170,925,828 had completed the second dose, and 62,595,913 had been inoculated with the third dose. 549,874 health professionals had received the second booster shot.
 19 September
 108,003,402 specimens had been tested from 70,461,323 people using RT-PCR, TCM, and antigen rapid tests. There were 2,971 suspected cases.
 Indonesia confirmed 1,620 new cases – the lowest since 4 July 2022, bringing the total number to 6,410,426. 3,390 patients recovered, bringing the number to 6,226,446. 23 patients deceased, bringing the tally to 157,915. All 514 municipalities and regencies had reported at least one positive case.
 As of 17:33 (UTC+7), 204,335,532 people had taken the first dose of vaccine, 170,947,982 had completed the second dose, and 62,708,566 had been inoculated with the third dose. 556,790 health professionals had received the second booster shot.
 20 September
 108,081,378 specimens had been tested from 70,499,040 people using RT-PCR, TCM, and antigen rapid tests. There were 5,332 suspected cases.
 Indonesia confirmed 2,518 new cases, bringing the total number to 6,410,426. 2,533 patients recovered, bringing the number to 6,228,979. 15 patients deceased, bringing the tally to 157,930. All 514 municipalities and regencies had reported at least one positive case.
 As of 20:02 (UTC+7), 204,361,971 people had taken the first dose of vaccine, 170,974,448 had completed the second dose, and 62,814,469 had been inoculated with the third dose. 563,275 health professionals had received the second booster shot.
 21 September
 108,151,698 specimens had been tested from 70,534,586 people using RT-PCR, TCM, and antigen rapid tests. There were 4,217 suspected cases.
 Indonesia confirmed 2,384 new cases, bringing the total number to 6,415,328. 2,991 patients recovered, bringing the number to 6,231,970. 18 patients deceased, bringing the tally to 157,948. All 514 municipalities and regencies had reported at least one positive case.
 As of 17:01 (UTC+7), 204,385,202 people had taken the first dose of vaccine, 170,996,855 had completed the second dose, and 62,906,698 had been inoculated with the third dose. 569,710 health professionals had received the second booster shot.
 22 September
 108,220,629 specimens had been tested from 70,568,856 people using RT-PCR, TCM, and antigen rapid tests. There were 4,924 suspected cases.
 Indonesia confirmed 2,162 new cases, bringing the total number to 6,417,490. 4,051 patients recovered, bringing the number to 6,236,021. 18 patients deceased, bringing the tally to 157,966. All 514 municipalities and regencies had reported at least one positive case.
 As of 17:21 (UTC+7), 204,402,378 people had taken the first dose of vaccine, 171,018,585 had completed the second dose, and 62,994,318 had been inoculated with the third dose. 577,130 health professionals had received the second booster shot.
 23 September
 108,280,205 specimens had been tested from 70,597,867 people using RT-PCR, TCM, and antigen rapid tests. There were 3,916 suspected cases.
 Indonesia confirmed 1,904 new cases, bringing the total number to 6,419,394. 3,077 patients recovered, bringing the number to 6,239,098. 20 patients deceased, bringing the tally to 157,986. All 514 municipalities and regencies had reported at least one positive case.
 As of 18:26 (UTC+7), 204,422,112 people had taken the first dose of vaccine, 171,042,518 had completed the second dose, and 63,077,892 had been inoculated with the third dose. 584,950 health professionals had received the second booster shot.
 24 September
 108,330,581 specimens had been tested from 70,622,250 people using RT-PCR, TCM, and antigen rapid tests. There were 3,991 suspected cases.
 Indonesia confirmed 1,724 new cases, bringing the total number to 6,421,118. 2,040 patients recovered, bringing the number to 6,241,138. 12 patients deceased, bringing the tally to 157,998. All 514 municipalities and regencies had reported at least one positive case.
 As of 18:34 (UTC+7), 204,462,776 people had taken the first dose of vaccine, 171,063,400 had completed the second dose, and 63,156,422 had been inoculated with the third dose. 591,415 health professionals had received the second booster shot.
 25 September
 108,372,888 specimens had been tested from 70,640,488 people using RT-PCR, TCM, and antigen rapid tests. There were 2,052 suspected cases.
 Indonesia confirmed 1,411 new cases – the lowest since 20 June 2022, bringing the total number to 6,422,529. 2,569 patients recovered, bringing the number to 6,243,707. 16 patients deceased, bringing the tally to 158,014. All 514 municipalities and regencies had reported at least one positive case.
 As of 18:34 (UTC+7), 204,470,553 people had taken the first dose of vaccine, 171,072,969 had completed the second dose, and 63,183,722 had been inoculated with the third dose. 591,794 health professionals had received the second booster shot.
 The number of active cases was 20,808, the lowest since 11 July 2022.
 26 September
 108,437,077 specimens had been tested from 70,668,112 people using RT-PCR, TCM, and antigen rapid tests. There were 2,052 suspected cases.
 Indonesia confirmed 1,344 new cases – the lowest since 20 June 2022, bringing the total number to 6,423,873. 2,842 patients recovered, bringing the number to 6,246,549. 22 patients deceased, bringing the tally to 158,036. All 514 municipalities and regencies had reported at least one positive case.
 As of 18:34 (UTC+7), 204,493,469 people had taken the first dose of vaccine, 171,096,383 had completed the second dose, and 63,262,236 had been inoculated with the third dose. 596,170 health professionals had received the second booster shot.
 The number of active cases was 19,288, the lowest since 8 July 2022.
 27 September
 108,516,957 specimens had been tested from 70,702,673 people using RT-PCR, TCM, and antigen rapid tests. There were 4,718 suspected cases.
 Indonesia confirmed 1,976 new cases, bringing the total number to 6,425,849. 2,070 patients recovered, bringing the number to 6,248,619. 21 patients deceased, bringing the tally to 158,057. All 514 municipalities and regencies had reported at least one positive case.
 As of 18:34 (UTC+7), 204,515,358 people had taken the first dose of vaccine, 171,120,465 had completed the second dose, and 63,347,356 had been inoculated with the third dose. 601,787 health professionals had received the second booster shot.
 The number of active cases was 19,173, the lowest since 8 July 2022.
 28 September
 108,590,948 specimens had been tested from 70,737,855 people using RT-PCR, TCM, and antigen rapid tests. There were 4,621 suspected cases.
 Indonesia confirmed 1,915 new cases, bringing the total number to 6,427,764. 1,884 patients recovered, bringing the number to 6,250,503. 19 patients deceased, bringing the tally to 158,076. All 514 municipalities and regencies had reported at least one positive case.
 As of 18:34 (UTC+7), 204,537,309 people had taken the first dose of vaccine, 171,140,378 had completed the second dose, and 63,424,129 had been inoculated with the third dose. 606,826 health professionals had received the second booster shot.
 29 September
 108,656,989 specimens had been tested from 70,770,790 people using RT-PCR, TCM, and antigen rapid tests. There were 4,528 suspected cases.
 Indonesia confirmed 2,003 new cases, bringing the total number to 6,429,767. 2,814 patients recovered, bringing the number to 6,253,317. 17 patients deceased, bringing the tally to 158,093. All 514 municipalities and regencies had reported at least one positive case.
 As of 18:08 (UTC+7), 204,561,548 people had taken the first dose of vaccine, 171,167,097 had completed the second dose, and 63,507,415 had been inoculated with the third dose. 613,046 health professionals had received the second booster shot.
 The number of active cases was 18,357, the lowest since 6 July 2022.
 30 September
 108,723,455 specimens had been tested from 70,802,227 people using RT-PCR, TCM, and antigen rapid tests. There were 4,393 suspected cases.
 Indonesia confirmed 1,857 new cases, bringing the total number to 6,431,624. 2,601 patients recovered, bringing the number to 6,255,918. 19 patients deceased, bringing the tally to 158,112. All 514 municipalities and regencies had reported at least one positive case.
 As of 18:08 (UTC+7), 204,577,179 people had taken the first dose of vaccine, 171,185,821 had completed the second dose, and 63,571,635 had been inoculated with the third dose. 618,702 health professionals had received the second booster shot.
 The number of active cases was 17,594, the lowest since 5 July 2022.

October
 1 October
 108,776,738 specimens had been tested from 70,827,026 people using RT-PCR, TCM, and antigen rapid tests. There were 3,927 suspected cases.
 Indonesia confirmed 1,639 new cases, bringing the total number to 6,433,263. 1,526 patients recovered, bringing the number to 6,257,444. 10 patients deceased, bringing the tally to 158,122. All 514 municipalities and regencies had reported at least one positive case.
 As of 18:19 (UTC+7), 204,591,442 people had taken the first dose of vaccine, 171,203,506 had completed the second dose, and 63,624,805 had been inoculated with the third dose. 622,180 health professionals had received the second booster shot.
 2 October
 108,810,849 specimens had been tested from 70,844,283 people using RT-PCR, TCM, and antigen rapid tests. There were 1,919 suspected cases.
 Indonesia confirmed 1,332 new cases, bringing the total number to 6,434,585. 1,575 patients recovered, bringing the number to 6,259,019. 10 patients deceased, bringing the tally to 158,132. All 514 municipalities and regencies had reported at least one positive case.
 As of 18:10 (UTC+7), 204,603,376 people had taken the first dose of vaccine, 171,213,498 had completed the second dose, and 63,649,101 had been inoculated with the third dose. 622,467 health professionals had received the second booster shot.
 The number of active cases was 17,434, the lowest since 5 July 2022.
 3 October
 108,873,040 specimens had been tested from 70,870,601 people using RT-PCR, TCM, and antigen rapid tests. There were 2,661 suspected cases.
 Indonesia confirmed 1,134 new cases, bringing the total number to 6,435,719. 2,263 patients recovered, bringing the number to 6,261,282. 11 patients deceased, bringing the tally to 158,143. All 514 municipalities and regencies had reported at least one positive case.
 As of 17:32 (UTC+7), 204,618,410 people had taken the first dose of vaccine, 171,229,832 had completed the second dose, and 63,703,003 had been inoculated with the third dose. 624,873 health professionals had received the second booster shot.
 The number of active cases was 16,294, the lowest since 29 June 2022.
 4 October
 108,944,731 specimens had been tested from 70,901,456 people using RT-PCR, TCM, and antigen rapid tests. There were 4,467 suspected cases.
 Indonesia confirmed 1,851 new cases, bringing the total number to 6,437,750. 1,538 patients recovered, bringing the number to 6,262,820. 13 patients deceased, bringing the tally to 158,156. All 514 municipalities and regencies had reported at least one positive case.
 As of 17:32 (UTC+7), 204,640,930 people had taken the first dose of vaccine, 171,256,285 had completed the second dose, and 63,823,506 had been inoculated with the third dose. 628,688 health professionals had received the second booster shot.
 5 October
 109,011,466 specimens had been tested from 70,931,825 people using RT-PCR, TCM, and antigen rapid tests. There were 4,816 suspected cases.
 Indonesia confirmed 1,722 new cases, bringing the total number to 6,439,292. 1,364 patients recovered, bringing the number to 6,264,184. 9 patients deceased, bringing the tally to 158,165. All 514 municipalities and regencies had reported at least one positive case.
 As of 18:45 (UTC+7), 204,657,665 people had taken the first dose of vaccine, 171,274,696 had completed the second dose, and 63,878,000 had been inoculated with the third dose. 631,278 health professionals had received the second booster shot.
 6 October
 109,071,951 specimens had been tested from 70,957,087 people using RT-PCR, TCM, and antigen rapid tests. There were 4,309 suspected cases.
 Indonesia confirmed 1,831 new cases, bringing the total number to 6,441,123. 1,715 patients recovered, bringing the number to 6,265,899. 12 patients deceased, bringing the tally to 158,177. All 514 municipalities and regencies had reported at least one positive case.
 As of 12:10 (UTC+7), 204,667,222 people had taken the first dose of vaccine, 171,286,846 had completed the second dose, and 63,920,103 had been inoculated with the third dose. 632,925 health professionals had received the second booster shot.
 7 October
 109,132,589 specimens had been tested from 70,982,943 people using RT-PCR, TCM, and antigen rapid tests. There were 4,055 suspected cases.
 Indonesia confirmed 1,501 new cases, bringing the total number to 6,442,624. 1,822 patients recovered, bringing the number to 6,267,721. 15 patients deceased, bringing the tally to 158,192. All 514 municipalities and regencies had reported at least one positive case.
 As of 08:58 (UTC+7), 204,678,004 people had taken the first dose of vaccine, 171,297,896 had completed the second dose, and 63,958,444 had been inoculated with the third dose. 634,544 health professionals had received the second booster shot.
 8 October
 109,176,268 specimens had been tested from 71,001,152 people using RT-PCR, TCM, and antigen rapid tests. There were 2,719 suspected cases.
 Indonesia confirmed 1,325 new cases, bringing the total number to 6,443,949. 1,541 patients recovered, bringing the number to 6,269,262. 6 patients deceased – the least since 24 July 2022, bringing the tally to 158,198. All 514 municipalities and regencies had reported at least one positive case.
 As of 04:44 (UTC+7), 204,690,338 people had taken the first dose of vaccine, 171,310,100 had completed the second dose, and 64,007,521 had been inoculated with the third dose. 637,548 health professionals had received the second booster shot.
 9 October
 109,205,625 specimens had been tested from 71,015,504 people using RT-PCR, TCM, and antigen rapid tests. There were 1,519 suspected cases.
 Indonesia confirmed 999 new cases, bringing the total number to 6,444,948. 1,273 patients recovered, bringing the number to 6,270,535. 7 patients deceased, bringing the tally to 158,205. All 514 municipalities and regencies had reported at least one positive case.
 As of 17:04 (UTC+7), 204,700,929 people had taken the first dose of vaccine, 171,321,993 had completed the second dose, and 64,039,502 had been inoculated with the third dose. 638,062 health professionals had received the second booster shot.
 The number of active cases was 16,208, the lowest since 29 June 2022.
 10 October
 109,268,056 specimens had been tested from 71,042,992 people using RT-PCR, TCM, and antigen rapid tests. There were 3,085 suspected cases.
 Indonesia confirmed 1,195 new cases, bringing the total number to 6,446,143. 1,518 patients recovered, bringing the number to 6,272,053. 14 patients deceased, bringing the tally to 158,219. All 514 municipalities and regencies had reported at least one positive case.
 As of 18:04 (UTC+7), 204,711,835 people had taken the first dose of vaccine, 171,334,598 had completed the second dose, and 64,077,324 had been inoculated with the third dose. 639,732 health professionals had received the second booster shot.
 The number of active cases was 15,871, the lowest since 28 June 2022.
 11 October
 109,341,629 specimens had been tested from 71,076,578 people using RT-PCR, TCM, and antigen rapid tests. There were 4,805 suspected cases.
 Indonesia confirmed 2,077 new cases, bringing the total number to 6,448,220. 1,540 patients recovered, bringing the number to 6,273,593. 16 patients deceased, bringing the tally to 158,235. All 514 municipalities and regencies had reported at least one positive case.
 As of 12:26 (UTC+7), 204,722,385 people had taken the first dose of vaccine, 171,345,141 had completed the second dose, and 64,111,815 had been inoculated with the third dose. 641,003 health professionals had received the second booster shot.
 12 October
 109,402,949 specimens had been tested from 71,107,681 people using RT-PCR, TCM, and antigen rapid tests. There were 4,433 suspected cases.
 Indonesia confirmed 2,028 new cases, bringing the total number to 6,450,248. 1,283 patients recovered, bringing the number to 6,274,876. 14 patients deceased, bringing the tally to 158,249. All 514 municipalities and regencies had reported at least one positive case.
 As of 21:33 (UTC+7), 204,742,486 people had taken the first dose of vaccine, 171,365,760 had completed the second dose, and 64,173,392 had been inoculated with the third dose. 643,833 health professionals had received the second booster shot.
 13 October
 109,466,219 specimens had been tested from 71,137,033 people using RT-PCR, TCM, and antigen rapid tests. There were 4,343 suspected cases.
 Indonesia confirmed 1,830 new cases, bringing the total number to 6,452,078. 1,713 patients recovered, bringing the number to 6,276,589. 14 patients deceased, bringing the tally to 158,263. All 514 municipalities and regencies had reported at least one positive case.
 As of 17:55 (UTC+7), 204,752,312 people had taken the first dose of vaccine, 171,380,835 had completed the second dose, and 64,220,262 had been inoculated with the third dose. 645,652 health professionals had received the second booster shot.
 14 October
 109,526,897 specimens had been tested from 71,163,842 people using RT-PCR, TCM, and antigen rapid tests. There were 4,460 suspected cases.
 Indonesia confirmed 1,786 new cases, bringing the total number to 6,453,864. 1,524 patients recovered, bringing the number to 6,278,113. 18 patients deceased, bringing the tally to 158,281. All 514 municipalities and regencies had reported at least one positive case.
 As of 20:04 (UTC+7), 204,762,689 people had taken the first dose of vaccine, 171,399,245 had completed the second dose, and 64,277,382 had been inoculated with the third dose. 648,224 health professionals had received the second booster shot.
 15 October
 109,575,332 specimens had been tested from 71,186,533 people using RT-PCR, TCM, and antigen rapid tests. There were 3,794 suspected cases.
 Indonesia confirmed 1,678 new cases, bringing the total number to 6,455,542. 1,867 patients recovered, bringing the number to 6,279,326. 20 patients deceased, bringing the tally to 158,301. All 514 municipalities and regencies had reported at least one positive case.
 As of 17:08 (UTC+7), 204,768,553 people had taken the first dose of vaccine, 171,409,459 had completed the second dose, and 64,311,935 had been inoculated with the third dose. 649,892 health professionals had received the second booster shot.
 16 October
 109,612,349 specimens had been tested from 71,202,620 people using RT-PCR, TCM, and antigen rapid tests. There were 2,288 suspected cases.
 Indonesia confirmed 1,326 new cases, bringing the total number to 6,456,868. 1,362 patients recovered, bringing the number to 6,281,342. 12 patients deceased, bringing the tally to 158,313. All 514 municipalities and regencies had reported at least one positive case.
 As of 18:12 (UTC+7), 204,775,169 people had taken the first dose of vaccine, 171,418,965 had completed the second dose, and 64,336,404 had been inoculated with the third dose. 650,342 health professionals had received the second booster shot.
 17 October
 109,672,450 specimens had been tested from 71,228,723 people using RT-PCR, TCM, and antigen rapid tests. There were 2,710 suspected cases.
 Indonesia confirmed 1,233 new cases, bringing the total number to 6,458,101. 1,609 patients recovered, bringing the number to 6,282,951. 14 patients deceased, bringing the tally to 158,327. All 514 municipalities and regencies had reported at least one positive case.
 As of 17:07 (UTC+7), 204,899,798 people had taken the first dose of vaccine, 171,552,919 had completed the second dose, and 64,451,480 had been inoculated with the third dose. 651,538 health professionals had received the second booster shot.
 18 October
 109,739,323 specimens had been tested from 71,260,659 people using RT-PCR, TCM, and antigen rapid tests. There were 5,006 suspected cases.
 Indonesia confirmed 2,164 new cases, bringing the total number to 6,460,265. 1,431 patients recovered, bringing the number to 6,284,382. 18 patients deceased, bringing the tally to 158,345. All 514 municipalities and regencies had reported at least one positive case.
 As of 18:22 (UTC+7), 205,055,280 people had taken the first dose of vaccine, 171,721,641 had completed the second dose, and 64,610,614 had been inoculated with the third dose. 653,462 health professionals had received the second booster shot.
 19 October
 109,807,776 specimens had been tested from 71,292,768 people using RT-PCR, TCM, and antigen rapid tests. There were 4,436 suspected cases.
 Indonesia confirmed 2,390 new cases, bringing the total number to 6,462,655. 1,408 patients recovered, bringing the number to 6,285,790. 16 patients deceased, bringing the tally to 158,361. All 514 municipalities and regencies had reported at least one positive case.
 As of 18:40 (UTC+7), 205,062,121 people had taken the first dose of vaccine, 171,736,344 had completed the second dose, and 64,651,895 had been inoculated with the third dose. 655,121 health professionals had received the second booster shot.
 20 October
 109,870,244 specimens had been tested from 71,321,939 people using RT-PCR, TCM, and antigen rapid tests. There were 4,863 suspected cases.
 Indonesia confirmed 2,307 new cases, bringing the total number to 6,464,962. 1,873 patients recovered, bringing the number to 6,287,663. 19 patients deceased, bringing the tally to 158,380. All 514 municipalities and regencies had reported at least one positive case.
 As of 18:12 (UTC+7), 205,071,436 people had taken the first dose of vaccine, 171,751,842 had completed the second dose, and 64,695,697 had been inoculated with the third dose. 656,735 health professionals had received the second booster shot.
 21 October
 109,927,936 specimens had been tested from 71,348,955 people using RT-PCR, TCM, and antigen rapid tests. There were 4,713 suspected cases.
 Indonesia confirmed 2,227 new cases, bringing the total number to 6,467,189. 1,970 patients recovered, bringing the number to 6,289,633. 18 patients deceased, bringing the tally to 158,398. All 514 municipalities and regencies had reported at least one positive case.
 As of 19:30 (UTC+7), 205,082,815 people had taken the first dose of vaccine, 171,767,078 had completed the second dose, and 64,735,611 had been inoculated with the third dose. 658,287 health professionals had received the second booster shot.
 22 October
 109,976,125 specimens had been tested from 71,371,929 people using RT-PCR, TCM, and antigen rapid tests. There were 3,773 suspected cases.
 Indonesia confirmed 2,087 new cases, bringing the total number to 6,469,276. 2,308 patients recovered, bringing the number to 6,291,941. 18 patients deceased, bringing the tally to 158,416. All 514 municipalities and regencies had reported at least one positive case.
 As of 17:35 (UTC+7), 205,089,475 people had taken the first dose of vaccine, 171,779,248 had completed the second dose, and 64,765,907 had been inoculated with the third dose. 659,194 health professionals had received the second booster shot.
 23 October
 110,010,718 specimens had been tested from 71,388,769 people using RT-PCR, TCM, and antigen rapid tests. There were 2,584 suspected cases.
 Indonesia confirmed 1,685 new cases, bringing the total number to 6,470,961. 1,206 patients recovered, bringing the number to 6,293,147. 13 patients deceased, bringing the tally to 158,429. All 514 municipalities and regencies had reported at least one positive case.
 As of 20:18 (UTC+7), 205,093,610 people had taken the first dose of vaccine, 171,790,291 had completed the second dose, and 64,786,060 had been inoculated with the third dose. 659,549 health professionals had received the second booster shot.
 24 October
 110,065,881 specimens had been tested from 71,414,274 people using RT-PCR, TCM, and antigen rapid tests. There were 2,963 suspected cases.
 Indonesia confirmed 1,703 new cases, bringing the total number to 6,472,664. 2,378 patients recovered, bringing the number to 6,295,525. 25 patients deceased – the most since 16 September 2022, bringing the tally to 158,454. All 514 municipalities and regencies had reported at least one positive case.
 As of 17:36 (UTC+7), 205,099,159 people had taken the first dose of vaccine, 171,802,718 had completed the second dose, and 64,815,840 had been inoculated with the third dose. 660,438 health professionals had received the second booster shot.
 25 October
 110,135,379 specimens had been tested from 71,444,293 people using RT-PCR, TCM, and antigen rapid tests. There were 4,772 suspected cases.
 Indonesia confirmed 3,008 new cases – the most since 8 September 2022, bringing the total number to 6,475,672. 2,378 patients recovered, bringing the number to 6,295,525. 21 patients deceased, bringing the tally to 158,454. All 514 municipalities and regencies had reported at least one positive case.
 As of 18:05 (UTC+7), 205,106,506 people had taken the first dose of vaccine, 171,817,669 had completed the second dose, and 64,851,931 had been inoculated with the third dose. 661,639 health professionals had received the second booster shot.
 The number of active cases added on this day was 1,230, the most since 27 August 2022. The total rose to 19,915, the most since 25 September 2022.
 26 October
 110,194,348 specimens had been tested from 71,474,078 people using RT-PCR, TCM, and antigen rapid tests. There were 4,751 suspected cases.
 Indonesia confirmed 3,048 new cases – the most since 8 September 2022, bringing the total number to 6,478,720. 1,458 patients recovered, bringing the number to 6,298,740. 24 patients deceased, bringing the tally to 158,499. All 514 municipalities and regencies had reported at least one positive case.
 As of 12:02 (UTC+7), 205,111,340 people had taken the first dose of vaccine, 171,828,287 had completed the second dose, and 64,877,879 had been inoculated with the third dose. 662,375 health professionals had received the second booster shot.
 The number of active cases added on this day was 1,566, the most since 27 August 2022. The total rose to 21,481, the most since 24 September 2022.
 27 October
 110,256,393 specimens had been tested from 71,503,221 people using RT-PCR, TCM, and antigen rapid tests. There were 5,105 suspected cases.
 Indonesia confirmed 3,029 new cases, bringing the total number to 6,481,749. 2,954 patients recovered – the most since 23 September 2022, bringing the number to 6,301,694. 23 patients deceased, bringing the tally to 158,522. All 514 municipalities and regencies had reported at least one positive case.
 As of 19:12 (UTC+7), 205,121,576 people had taken the first dose of vaccine, 171,846,803 had completed the second dose, and 64,925,626 had been inoculated with the third dose. 664,100 health professionals had received the second booster shot.
 The total number of active cases rose to 21,533, the most since 24 September 2022.
 28 October
 110,316,326 specimens had been tested from 71,530,534 people using RT-PCR, TCM, and antigen rapid tests. There were 4,816 suspected cases.
 Indonesia confirmed 3,015 new cases, bringing the total number to 6,484,764. 1,783 patients recovered, bringing the number to 6,303,477. 22 patients deceased, bringing the tally to 158,544. All 514 municipalities and regencies had reported at least one positive case.
 As of 17:01 (UTC+7), 205,127,972 people had taken the first dose of vaccine, 171,858,544 had completed the second dose, and 64,962,493 had been inoculated with the third dose. 665,237 health professionals had received the second booster shot.
 The total number of active cases rose to 22,743, the most since 22 September 2022.
 29 October
 110,366,308 specimens had been tested from 71,551,967 people using RT-PCR, TCM, and antigen rapid tests. There were 4,985 suspected cases.
 Indonesia confirmed 3,141 new cases – the most since 7 September 2022, bringing the total number to 6,487,905. 2,109 patients recovered, bringing the number to 6,305,586. 27 patients deceased – the joint-most since 16 September 2022, bringing the tally to 158,571. All 514 municipalities and regencies had reported at least one positive case.
 As of 12:02 (UTC+7), 205,132,557 people had taken the first dose of vaccine, 171,865,802 had completed the second dose, and 64,983,827 had been inoculated with the third dose. 665,661 health professionals had received the second booster shot.
 The total number of active cases rose to 23,748, the most since 21 September 2022.
 30 October
 110,403,412 specimens had been tested from 71,569,148 people using RT-PCR, TCM, and antigen rapid tests. There were 2,532 suspected cases.
 Indonesia confirmed 2,717 new cases, bringing the total number to 6,490,622. 1,895 patients recovered, bringing the number to 6,307,481. 26 patients deceased, bringing the tally to 158,597. All 514 municipalities and regencies had reported at least one positive case.
 As of 17:37 (UTC+7), 205,139,700 people had taken the first dose of vaccine, 171,875,939 had completed the second dose, and 65,012,134 had been inoculated with the third dose. 666,753 health professionals had received the second booster shot.
 The total number of active cases rose to 24,544, the most since 21 September 2022.
 31 October
 110,460,446 specimens had been tested from 71,593,003 people using RT-PCR, TCM, and antigen rapid tests. There were 2,916 suspected cases.
 Indonesia confirmed 2,457 new cases, bringing the total number to 6,493,079. 2,309 patients recovered, bringing the number to 6,309,790. 34 patients deceased – the joint-most since 19 April 2022, bringing the tally to 158,631. All 514 municipalities and regencies had reported at least one positive case.
 As of 17:34 (UTC+7), 205,146,012 people had taken the first dose of vaccine, 171,890,243 had completed the second dose, and 65,046,649 had been inoculated with the third dose. 667,558 health professionals had received the second booster shot.
 The total number of active cases rose to 24,658, the most since 21 September 2022.

November
 1 November
 110,536,735 specimens had been tested from 71,624,064 people using RT-PCR, TCM, and antigen rapid tests. There were 5,552 suspected cases.
 Indonesia confirmed 4,707 new cases – the most since 30 August 2022, bringing the total number to 6,497,786. 2,071 patients recovered, bringing the number to 6,311,861. 32 patients deceased, bringing the tally to 158,663. All 514 municipalities and regencies had reported at least one positive case.
 As of 19:06 (UTC+7), 205,155,158 people had taken the first dose of vaccine, 171,910,630 had completed the second dose, and 65,106,363 had been inoculated with the third dose. 668,996 health professionals had received the second booster shot.
 The number of active cases added on this day was 2,604, the most since 26 July 2022. The total rose to 27,262, the most since 18 September 2022.
 2 November
 110,601,939 specimens had been tested from 71,654,584 people using RT-PCR, TCM, and antigen rapid tests. There were 5,941 suspected cases.
 Indonesia confirmed 4,873 new cases – the most since 30 August 2022, bringing the total number to 6,502,659. 2,050 patients recovered, bringing the number to 6,313,911. 32 patients deceased, bringing the tally to 158,695. All 514 municipalities and regencies had reported at least one positive case.
 As of 11:27 (UTC+7), 205,159,120 people had taken the first dose of vaccine, 171,920,407 had completed the second dose, and 65,138,522 had been inoculated with the third dose. 669,805 health professionals had received the second booster shot.
 The number of active cases added on this day was 2,791, the most since 26 July 2022. The total rose to 30,053, the most since 15 September 2022.
 3 November
 110,668,196 specimens had been tested from 71,685,572 people using RT-PCR, TCM, and antigen rapid tests. There were 5,462 suspected cases.
 Indonesia confirmed 4,951 new cases – the most since 30 August 2022, bringing the total number to 6,507,610. 2,882 patients recovered – the most since 23 September 2022, bringing the number to 6,316,793. 42 patients deceased – the most since 14 April 2022, bringing the tally to 158,737. All 514 municipalities and regencies had reported at least one positive case.
 As of 17:03 (UTC+7), 205,172,675 people had taken the first dose of vaccine, 171,949,679 had completed the second dose, and 65,238,591 had been inoculated with the third dose. 674,392 health professionals had received the second booster shot.
 The total number of active cases rose to 32,080, the most since 12 September 2022.
 4 November
 110,730,930 specimens had been tested from 71,715,470 people using RT-PCR, TCM, and antigen rapid tests. There were 6,042 suspected cases.
 Indonesia confirmed 5,303 new cases – the most since 24 August 2022, bringing the total number to 6,512,913. 3,197 patients recovered – the most since 22 September 2022, bringing the number to 6,319,990. 31 patients deceased, bringing the tally to 158,768. All 514 municipalities and regencies had reported at least one positive case.
 As of 18:48 (UTC+7), 205,181,380 people had taken the first dose of vaccine, 171,969,705 had completed the second dose, and 65,309,364 had been inoculated with the third dose. 678,703 health professionals had received the second booster shot.
 The total number of active cases rose to 34,155, the most since 10 September 2022.
 5 November
 110,783,338 specimens had been tested from 71,740,386 people using RT-PCR, TCM, and antigen rapid tests. There were 5,174 suspected cases.
 Indonesia confirmed 4,717 new cases, bringing the total number to 6,517,630. 2,930 patients recovered, bringing the number to 6,322,920. 39 patients deceased, bringing the tally to 158,807. All 514 municipalities and regencies had reported at least one positive case.
 As of 18:56 (UTC+7), 205,188,237 people had taken the first dose of vaccine, 171,985,974 had completed the second dose, and 65,372,101 had been inoculated with the third dose. 682,251 health professionals had received the second booster shot.
 The total number of active cases rose to 35,903, the most since 8 September 2022.
 6 November
 110,823,463 specimens had been tested from 71,758,720 people using RT-PCR, TCM, and antigen rapid tests. There were 3,297 suspected cases.
 Indonesia confirmed 3,662 new cases, bringing the total number to 6,521,292. 2,495 patients recovered, bringing the number to 6,325,415. 22 patients deceased, bringing the tally to 158,829. All 514 municipalities and regencies had reported at least one positive case.
 As of 12:24 (UTC+7), 205,190,090 people had taken the first dose of vaccine, 171,989,257 had completed the second dose, and 65,379,116 had been inoculated with the third dose. 682,436 health professionals had received the second booster shot.
 The total number of active cases rose to 37,048, the most since 8 September 2022.
 7 November
 110,883,893 specimens had been tested from 71,783,168 people using RT-PCR, TCM, and antigen rapid tests. There were 3,551 suspected cases.
 Indonesia confirmed 3,828 new cases, bringing the total number to 6,525,120. 3,348 patients recovered – the most since 22 September 2022, bringing the number to 6,328,763. 42 patients deceased – the joint-most since 14 April 2022, bringing the tally to 158,871. All 514 municipalities and regencies had reported at least one positive case.
 As of 19:56 (UTC+7), 205,201,515 people had taken the first dose of vaccine, 172,012,612 had completed the second dose, and 65,454,762 had been inoculated with the third dose. 685,469 health professionals had received the second booster shot.
 The total number of active cases rose to 37,486, the most since 8 September 2022.
 8 November
 110,961,033 specimens had been tested from 71,819,034 people using RT-PCR, TCM, and antigen rapid tests. There were 5,054 suspected cases.
 Indonesia confirmed 6,601 new cases – the most since 19 March 2022, bringing the total number to 6,531,721. 3,197 patients recovered, bringing the number to 6,331,960. 38 patients deceased, bringing the tally to 158,909. All 514 municipalities and regencies had reported at least one positive case.
 As of 17:43 (UTC+7), 205,211,694 people had taken the first dose of vaccine, 172,032,572 had completed the second dose, and 65,518,389 had been inoculated with the third dose. 688,781 health professionals had received the second booster shot.
 The number of active cases added on this day was 3,366, the most since 26 February 2022. The total rose to 40,852, the most since 4 September 2022.
 9 November
 111,027,963 specimens had been tested from 71,850,105 people using RT-PCR, TCM, and antigen rapid tests. There were 6,622 suspected cases.
 Indonesia confirmed 6,186 new cases, bringing the total number to 6,537,907. 3,198 patients recovered – the most since 22 September 2022, bringing the number to 6,335,158. 43 patients deceased – the most since 14 April 2022, bringing the tally to 158,952. All 514 municipalities and regencies had reported at least one positive case.
 As of 17:32 (UTC+7), 205,222,099 people had taken the first dose of vaccine, 172,052,141 had completed the second dose, and 65,581,953 had been inoculated with the third dose. 691,989 health professionals had received the second booster shot.
 The total number of active cases rose to 43,797, the most since 2 September 2022.
 10 November
 111,091,832 specimens had been tested from 71,879,586 people using RT-PCR, TCM, and antigen rapid tests. There were 5,860 suspected cases.
 Indonesia confirmed 6,294 new cases, bringing the total number to 6,544,201. 4,223 patients recovered – the most since 9 September 2022, bringing the number to 6,339,381. 37 patients deceased, bringing the tally to 158,989. All 514 municipalities and regencies had reported at least one positive case.
 As of 16:48 (UTC+7), 205,231,120 people had taken the first dose of vaccine, 172,068,497 had completed the second dose, and 65,627,694 had been inoculated with the third dose. 695,680 health professionals had received the second booster shot.
 The total number of active cases rose to 45,831, the most since 28 August 2022.
 11 November
 111,154,183 specimens had been tested from 71,908,323 people using RT-PCR, TCM, and antigen rapid tests. There were 5,974 suspected cases.
 Indonesia confirmed 6,247 new cases, bringing the total number to 6,550,448. 4,139 patients recovered, bringing the number to 6,343,520. 46 patients deceased – the most since 14 April 2022, bringing the tally to 159,035. All 514 municipalities and regencies had reported at least one positive case.
 As of 18:16 (UTC+7), 205,241,672 people had taken the first dose of vaccine, 172,089,941 had completed the second dose, and 65,693,324 had been inoculated with the third dose. 700,480 health professionals had received the second booster shot.
 The total number of active cases rose to 47,893, the most since 24 August 2022.
 12 November
 111,213,051 specimens had been tested from 71,936,175 people using RT-PCR, TCM, and antigen rapid tests. There were 5,622 suspected cases.
 Indonesia confirmed 6,179 new cases, bringing the total number to 6,556,627. 4,739 patients recovered – the most since 9 September 2022, bringing the number to 6,348,259. 33 patients deceased, bringing the tally to 159,068. All 514 municipalities and regencies had reported at least one positive case.
 As of 17:12 (UTC+7), 205,248,786 people had taken the first dose of vaccine, 172,099,765 had completed the second dose, and 65,721,330 had been inoculated with the third dose. 702,421 health professionals had received the second booster shot.
 The total number of active cases rose to 49,300, the most since 21 August 2022.
 13 November
 111,258,388 specimens had been tested from 71,956,315 people using RT-PCR, TCM, and antigen rapid tests. There were 3,596 suspected cases.
 Indonesia confirmed 4,877 new cases, bringing the total number to 6,561,504. 4,347 patients recovered, bringing the number to 6,352,606. 36 patients deceased, bringing the tally to 159,104. All 514 municipalities and regencies had reported at least one positive case.
 As of 23:59 (UTC+7), 205,248,786 people had taken the first dose of vaccine, 172,099,765 had completed the second dose, and 65,721,330 had been inoculated with the third dose. 702,421 health professionals had received the second booster shot.
 The total number of active cases rose to 49,794, the most since 21 August 2022.
 14 November
 111,327,991 specimens had been tested from 71,985,687 people using RT-PCR, TCM, and antigen rapid tests. There were 3,521 suspected cases.
 Indonesia confirmed 4,408 new cases, bringing the total number to 6,565,912. 4,188 patients recovered, bringing the number to 6,356,794. 54 patients deceased – the most since 5 April 2022, bringing the tally to 159,158. All 514 municipalities and regencies had reported at least one positive case.
 As of 23:59 (UTC+7), 205,248,786 people had taken the first dose of vaccine, 172,099,765 had completed the second dose, and 65,721,330 had been inoculated with the third dose. 702,421 health professionals had received the second booster shot.
 The total number of active cases rose to 49,960, the most since 21 August 2022.
 15 November
 111,417,478 specimens had been tested from 72,025,791 people using RT-PCR, TCM, and antigen rapid tests. There were 6,925 suspected cases.
 Indonesia confirmed 7,893 new cases – the most since 19 March 2022, bringing the total number to 6,573,805. 4,038 patients recovered, bringing the number to 6,360,832. 41 patients deceased, bringing the tally to 159,199. All 514 municipalities and regencies had reported at least one positive case.
 As of 16:33 (UTC+7), 205,272,373 people had taken the first dose of vaccine, 172,133,110 had completed the second dose, and 65,807,127 had been inoculated with the third dose. 706,703 health professionals had received the second booster shot.
 The number of active cases added on this day was 3,814, the most since 26 February 2022. The total rose to 53,774, the most since 17 April 2022.
 16 November
 111,502,173 specimens had been tested from 72,064,730 people using RT-PCR, TCM, and antigen rapid tests. There were 7,172 suspected cases.
 Indonesia confirmed 8,486 new cases – the most since 18 March 2022, bringing the total number to 6,582,291. 4,255 patients recovered, bringing the number to 6,365,087. 54 patients deceased – the joint-most since 5 April 2022, bringing the tally to 159,253. All 514 municipalities and regencies had reported at least one positive case.
 As of 18:09 (UTC+7), 205,281,764 people had taken the first dose of vaccine, 172,147,016 had completed the second dose, and 65,844,458 had been inoculated with the third dose. 709,383 health professionals had received the second booster shot.
 The number of active cases added on this day was 4,177, the most since 26 February 2022. The total rose to 57,951, the most since 17 April 2022.
 17 November
 111,582,012 specimens had been tested from 72,100,768 people using RT-PCR, TCM, and antigen rapid tests. There were 6,867 suspected cases.
 Indonesia confirmed 7,822 new cases, bringing the total number to 6,590,113. 5,264 patients recovered – the most since 9 September 2022, bringing the number to 6,370,351. 38 patients deceased, bringing the tally to 159,291. All 514 municipalities and regencies had reported at least one positive case.
 As of 17:40 (UTC+7), 205,292,523 people had taken the first dose of vaccine, 172,182,185 had completed the second dose, and 65,960,895 had been inoculated with the third dose. 714,888 health professionals had received the second booster shot.
 The total number of active cases rose to 60,471, the most since 16 April 2022.
 18 November
 111,660,489 specimens had been tested from 72,134,679 people using RT-PCR, TCM, and antigen rapid tests. There were 6,207 suspected cases.
 Indonesia confirmed 6,699 new cases, bringing the total number to 6,596,812. 5,854 patients recovered – the most since 21 August 2022, bringing the number to 6,376,205. 32 patients deceased, bringing the tally to 159,323. All 514 municipalities and regencies had reported at least one positive case.
 As of 17:52 (UTC+7), 205,300,621 people had taken the first dose of vaccine, 172,201,486 had completed the second dose, and 66,013,846 had been inoculated with the third dose. 719,466 health professionals had received the second booster shot.
 The total number of active cases rose to 61,284, the most since 15 April 2022.
 19 November
 111,724,301 specimens had been tested from 72,163,077 people using RT-PCR, TCM, and antigen rapid tests. There were 5,693 suspected cases.
 Indonesia confirmed 6,383 new cases, bringing the total number to 6,603,195. 4,914 patients recovered, bringing the number to 6,381,119. 25 patients deceased, bringing the tally to 159,348. All 514 municipalities and regencies had reported at least one positive case.
 As of 11:30 (UTC+7), 205,306,678 people had taken the first dose of vaccine, 172,225,680 had completed the second dose, and 66,094,359 had been inoculated with the third dose. 724,123 health professionals had received the second booster shot.
 The total number of active cases rose to 62,728, the most since 14 April 2022.
 20 November
 111,772,509 specimens had been tested from 72,184,991 people using RT-PCR, TCM, and antigen rapid tests. There were 3,985 suspected cases.
 Indonesia confirmed 5,172 new cases, bringing the total number to 6,608,367. 5,690 patients recovered, bringing the number to 6,386,809. 31 patients deceased, bringing the tally to 159,379. All 514 municipalities and regencies had reported at least one positive case.
 As of 11:03 (UTC+7), 205,313,420 people had taken the first dose of vaccine, 172,240,002 had completed the second dose, and 66,139,689 had been inoculated with the third dose. 726,373 health professionals had received the second booster shot.
 21 November
 111,842,418 specimens had been tested from 72,211,883 people using RT-PCR, TCM, and antigen rapid tests. There were 3,888 suspected cases.
 Indonesia confirmed 4,306 new cases, bringing the total number to 6,612,673. 6,855 patients recovered – the most since 22 April 2022, bringing the number to 6,393,664. 43 patients deceased, bringing the tally to 159,422. All 514 municipalities and regencies had reported at least one positive case.
 As of 17:25 (UTC+7), 205,323,890 people had taken the first dose of vaccine, 172,260,213 had completed the second dose, and 66,196,075 had been inoculated with the third dose. 728,972 health professionals had received the second booster shot.
 The number of active cases decreased on this day was 2,592, the most since 26 April 2022.
 22 November
 111,931,755 specimens had been tested from 72,244,080 people using RT-PCR, TCM, and antigen rapid tests. There were 6,185 suspected cases.
 Indonesia confirmed 7,644 new cases, bringing the total number to 6,620,317. 4,984 patients recovered, bringing the number to 6,398,648. 51 patients deceased, bringing the tally to 159,473. All 514 municipalities and regencies had reported at least one positive case.
 As of 14:09 (UTC+7), 205,330,851 people had taken the first dose of vaccine, 172,276,932 had completed the second dose, and 66,248,452 had been inoculated with the third dose. 731,836 health professionals had received the second booster shot.
 23 November
 112,010,136 specimens had been tested from 72,277,075 people using RT-PCR, TCM, and antigen rapid tests. There were 7,133 suspected cases.
 Indonesia confirmed 7,221 new cases, bringing the total number to 6,627,538. 4,903 patients recovered, bringing the number to 6,403,551. 51 patients deceased, bringing the tally to 159,524. All 514 municipalities and regencies had reported at least one positive case.
 As of 16:52 (UTC+7), 205,393,882 people had taken the first dose of vaccine, 172,351,561 had completed the second dose, and 66,362,852 had been inoculated with the third dose. 736,101 health professionals had received the second booster shot.
 The total number of active cases rose to 64,463, the most since 13 April 2022.
 24 November
 112,088,248 specimens had been tested from 72,313,160 people using RT-PCR, TCM, and antigen rapid tests. There were 6,320 suspected cases.
 Indonesia confirmed 7,110 new cases, bringing the total number to 6,634,648. 7,669 patients recovered – the most since 22 April 2022, bringing the number to 6,411,220. 41 patients deceased, bringing the tally to 159,565. All 514 municipalities and regencies had reported at least one positive case.
 As of 17:45 (UTC+7), 205,403,655 people had taken the first dose of vaccine, 172,373,178 had completed the second dose, and 66,434,458 had been inoculated with the third dose. 740,386 health professionals had received the second booster shot.
 61-year-old President Joko Widodo officially launched the second booster shot for elderlies aged above 59 by being injected with locally-made IndoVac.
 25 November
 112,161,548 specimens had been tested from 72,342,278 people using RT-PCR, TCM, and antigen rapid tests. There were 6,000 suspected cases.
 Indonesia confirmed 5,976 new cases, bringing the total number to 6,640,624. 6,752 patients recovered, bringing the number to 6,417,972. 35 patients deceased, bringing the tally to 159,600. All 514 municipalities and regencies had reported at least one positive case.
 As of 12:07 (UTC+7), 205,409,201 people had taken the first dose of vaccine, 172,384,615 had completed the second dose, and 66,474,137 had been inoculated with the third dose. 742,421 health professionals had received the second booster shot.
 26 November
 112,220,477 specimens had been tested from 72,368,729 people using RT-PCR, TCM, and antigen rapid tests. There were 5,295 suspected cases.
 Indonesia confirmed 5,469 new cases, bringing the total number to 6,646,093. 6,360 patients recovered, bringing the number to 6,424,332. 41 patients deceased, bringing the tally to 159,641. All 514 municipalities and regencies had reported at least one positive case.
 As of 23:59 (UTC+7), 205,409,201 people had taken the first dose of vaccine, 172,384,615 had completed the second dose, and 66,474,137 had been inoculated with the third dose. 742,421 health professionals had received the second booster shot.
 27 November
 112,262,636 specimens had been tested from 72,391,233 people using RT-PCR, TCM, and antigen rapid tests. There were 2,799 suspected cases.
 Indonesia confirmed 4,151 new cases, bringing the total number to 6,650,244. 5,655 patients recovered, bringing the number to 6,429,987. 35 patients deceased, bringing the tally to 159,676. All 514 municipalities and regencies had reported at least one positive case.
 As of 23:59 (UTC+7), 205,409,201 people had taken the first dose of vaccine, 172,384,615 had completed the second dose, and 66,474,137 had been inoculated with the third dose. 742,421 health professionals had received the second booster shot.
 28 November
 112,326,546 specimens had been tested from 72,426,706 people using RT-PCR, TCM, and antigen rapid tests. There were 3,631 suspected cases.
 Indonesia confirmed 3,225 new cases, bringing the total number to 6,653,469. 5,864 patients recovered, bringing the number to 6,435,851. 59 patients deceased – the most since 5 April 2022, bringing the tally to 159,735. All 514 municipalities and regencies had reported at least one positive case.
 As of 09:06 (UTC+7), 203,715,848 – oddly reduced by 1,693,353 – people had taken the first dose of vaccine, 174,119,714 had completed the second dose, and 66,624,569 had been inoculated with the third dose. 795,294 health professionals and elderlies had received the second booster shot.
 29 November
 112,408,992 specimens had been tested from 72,475,605 people using RT-PCR, TCM, and antigen rapid tests. There were 6,579 suspected cases.
 Indonesia confirmed 5,766 new cases, bringing the total number to 6,659,235. 5,476 patients recovered, bringing the number to 6,441,327. 54 patients deceased, bringing the tally to 159,789. All 514 municipalities and regencies had reported at least one positive case.
 As of 23:59 (UTC+7), 203,715,848 people had taken the first dose of vaccine, 174,119,714 had completed the second dose, and 66,624,569 had been inoculated with the third dose. 795,294 health professionals and elderlies had received the second booster shot.
 30 November
 112,482,021 specimens had been tested from 72,517,527 people using RT-PCR, TCM, and antigen rapid tests. There were 5,432 suspected cases.
 Indonesia confirmed 5,609 new cases, bringing the total number to 6,664,844. 4,411 patients recovered, bringing the number to 6,445,738. 41 patients deceased, bringing the tally to 159,830. All 514 municipalities and regencies had reported at least one positive case.
 As of 19:19 (UTC+7), 203,692,218 – oddly reduced by 23,630 – people had taken the first dose of vaccine, 174,239,124 had completed the second dose, and 66,862,019 had been inoculated with the third dose. 863,582 health professionals and elderlies had received the second booster shot.

December
 1 December
 112,552,055 specimens had been tested from 72,559,191 people using RT-PCR, TCM, and antigen rapid tests. There were 5,247 suspected cases.
 Indonesia confirmed 4,977 new cases, bringing the total number to 6,669,821. 6,499 patients recovered, bringing the number to 6,452,237. 54 patients deceased, bringing the tally to 159,884. All 514 municipalities and regencies had reported at least one positive case.
 As of 20:12 (UTC+7), 203,707,513 people had taken the first dose of vaccine, 174,260,097 had completed the second dose, and 66,938,549 had been inoculated with the third dose. 885,695 health professionals and elderlies had received the second booster shot.
 2 December
 112,612,890 specimens had been tested from 72,595,024 people using RT-PCR, TCM, and antigen rapid tests. There were 4,881 suspected cases.
 Indonesia confirmed 4,179 new cases, bringing the total number to 6,674,000. 6,001 patients recovered, bringing the number to 6,458,238. 37 patients deceased, bringing the tally to 159,921. All 514 municipalities and regencies had reported at least one positive case.
 As of 23:59 (UTC+7), 203,707,513 people had taken the first dose of vaccine, 174,260,097 had completed the second dose, and 66,938,549 had been inoculated with the third dose. 885,695 health professionals and elderlies had received the second booster shot.
 3 December
 112,663,528 specimens had been tested from 72,628,384 people using RT-PCR, TCM, and antigen rapid tests. There were 4,083 suspected cases.
 Indonesia confirmed 3,655 new cases, bringing the total number to 6,677,655. 5,228 patients recovered, bringing the number to 6,463,466. 32 patients deceased, bringing the tally to 159,953. All 514 municipalities and regencies had reported at least one positive case.
 As of 16:58 (UTC+7), 203,730,045 people had taken the first dose of vaccine, 174,292,461 had completed the second dose, and 67,064,567 had been inoculated with the third dose. 920,638 health professionals and elderlies had received the second booster shot.
 4 December
 112,703,337 specimens had been tested from 72,653,453 people using RT-PCR, TCM, and antigen rapid tests. There were 2,545 suspected cases.
 Indonesia confirmed 2,548 new cases, bringing the total number to 6,680,203. 5,772 patients recovered, bringing the number to 6,469,238. 25 patients deceased, bringing the tally to 159,978. All 514 municipalities and regencies had reported at least one positive case.
 As of 18:46 (UTC+7), 203,735,609 people had taken the first dose of vaccine, 174,303,598 had completed the second dose, and 67,088,130 had been inoculated with the third dose. 923,328 health professionals and elderlies had received the second booster shot.
 5 December
 112,761,095 specimens had been tested from 72,692,702 people using RT-PCR, TCM, and antigen rapid tests. There were 3,018 suspected cases.
 Indonesia confirmed 2,234 new cases, bringing the total number to 6,682,437. 5,033 patients recovered, bringing the number to 6,474,271. 48 patients deceased, bringing the tally to 160,026. All 514 municipalities and regencies had reported at least one positive case.
 As of 18:19 (UTC+7), 203,745,204 people had taken the first dose of vaccine, 174,323,143 had completed the second dose, and 67,150,711 had been inoculated with the third dose. 939,537 health professionals and elderlies had received the second booster shot.
 6 December
 112,835,077 specimens had been tested from 72,737,303 people using RT-PCR, TCM, and antigen rapid tests. There were 5,554 suspected cases.
 Indonesia confirmed 3,744 new cases, bringing the total number to 6,686,181. 4,179 patients recovered, bringing the number to 6,478,450. 45 patients deceased, bringing the tally to 160,071. All 514 municipalities and regencies had reported at least one positive case.
 As of 17:20 (UTC+7), 203,759,538 people had taken the first dose of vaccine, 174,345,886 had completed the second dose, and 67,235,823 had been inoculated with the third dose. 959,495 health professionals and elderlies had received the second booster shot.
 7 December
 112,897,538 specimens had been tested from 72,777,982 people using RT-PCR, TCM, and antigen rapid tests. There were 5,175 suspected cases.
 Indonesia confirmed 3,351 new cases, bringing the total number to 6,689,532. 3,240 patients recovered, bringing the number to 6,481,690. 41 patients deceased, bringing the tally to 160,112. All 514 municipalities and regencies had reported at least one positive case.
 As of 23:59 (UTC+7), 203,759,538 people had taken the first dose of vaccine, 174,345,886 had completed the second dose, and 67,235,823 had been inoculated with the third dose. 959,495 health professionals and elderlies had received the second booster shot.
 8 December
 112,955,652 specimens had been tested from 72,813,483 people using RT-PCR, TCM, and antigen rapid tests. There were 4,412 suspected cases.
 Indonesia confirmed 2,977 new cases, bringing the total number to 6,692,509. 5,118 patients recovered, bringing the number to 6,486,808. 27 patients deceased, bringing the tally to 160,139. All 514 municipalities and regencies had reported at least one positive case.
 As of 17:02 (UTC+7), 203,803,917 people had taken the first dose of vaccine, 174,403,132 had completed the second dose, and 67,381,108 had been inoculated with the third dose. 988,740 health professionals and elderlies had received the second booster shot.
 9 December
 113,009,498 specimens had been tested from 72,849,242 people using RT-PCR, TCM, and antigen rapid tests. There were 4,182 suspected cases.
 Indonesia confirmed 2,501 new cases, bringing the total number to 6,695,010. 4,711 patients recovered, bringing the number to 6,491,519. 36 patients deceased, bringing the tally to 160,175. All 514 municipalities and regencies had reported at least one positive case.
 As of 23:59 (UTC+7), 203,816,464 people had taken the first dose of vaccine, 174,422,670 had completed the second dose, and 67,449,134 had been inoculated with the third dose. 1,004,199 health professionals and elderlies had received the second booster shot.
 10 December
 113,052,948 specimens had been tested from 72,878,053 people using RT-PCR, TCM, and antigen rapid tests. There were 3,691 suspected cases.
 Indonesia confirmed 2,191 new cases, bringing the total number to 6,697,201. 3,507 patients recovered, bringing the number to 6,495,026. 23 patients deceased, bringing the tally to 160,198. All 514 municipalities and regencies had reported at least one positive case.
 As of 23:59 (UTC+7), 203,816,464 people had taken the first dose of vaccine, 174,422,670 had completed the second dose, and 67,449,134 had been inoculated with the third dose. 1,004,199 health professionals and elderlies had received the second booster shot.
 11 December
 113,086,080 specimens had been tested from 72,899,819 people using RT-PCR, TCM, and antigen rapid tests. There were 2,253 suspected cases.
 Indonesia confirmed 1,589 new cases – the lowest since 17 October 2022, bringing the total number to 6,698,790. 3,731 patients recovered, bringing the number to 6,498,757. 26 patients deceased, bringing the tally to 160,224. All 514 municipalities and regencies had reported at least one positive case.
 As of 17:24 (UTC+7), 203,833,159 people had taken the first dose of vaccine, 174,449,231 had completed the second dose, and 67,522,970 had been inoculated with the third dose. 1,018,280 health professionals and elderlies had received the second booster shot.
 12 December
 113,134,923 specimens had been tested from 72,934,460 people using RT-PCR, TCM, and antigen rapid tests. There were 2,398 suspected cases.
 Indonesia confirmed 1,225 new cases – the lowest since 10 October 2022, bringing the total number to 6,700,015. 3,848 patients recovered, bringing the number to 6,502,605. 31 patients deceased, bringing the tally to 160,255. All 514 municipalities and regencies had reported at least one positive case.
 As of 23:59 (UTC+7), 203,842,017 people had taken the first dose of vaccine, 174,464,942 had completed the second dose, and 67,561,982 had been inoculated with the third dose. 1,026,873 health professionals and elderlies had received the second booster shot.
 13 December
 113,197,060 specimens had been tested from 72,974,305 people using RT-PCR, TCM, and antigen rapid tests. There were 3,996 suspected cases.
 Indonesia confirmed 2,117 new cases, bringing the total number to 6,702,132. 3,402 patients recovered, bringing the number to 6,506,007. 32 patients deceased, bringing the tally to 160,287. All 514 municipalities and regencies had reported at least one positive case.
 As of 12:20 (UTC+7), 203,852,702 people had taken the first dose of vaccine, 174,487,581 had completed the second dose, and 67,655,526 had been inoculated with the third dose. 1,044,912 health professionals and elderlies had received the second booster shot.
 14 December
 113,251,877 specimens had been tested from 73,014,019 people using RT-PCR, TCM, and antigen rapid tests. There were 3,867 suspected cases.
 Indonesia confirmed 2,136 new cases, bringing the total number to 6,704,268. 2,508 patients recovered, bringing the number to 6,508,515. 24 patients deceased, bringing the tally to 160,311. All 514 municipalities and regencies had reported at least one positive case.
 As of 23:59 (UTC+7), 203,868,513 people had taken the first dose of vaccine, 174,515,059 had completed the second dose, and 67,750,775 had been inoculated with the third dose. 1,060,481 health professionals and elderlies had received the second booster shot.
 15 December
 113,303,536 specimens had been tested from 73,050,260 people using RT-PCR, TCM, and antigen rapid tests. There were 3,270 suspected cases.
 Indonesia confirmed 1,785 new cases, bringing the total number to 6,706,053. 3,779 patients recovered, bringing the number to 6,512,294. 24 patients deceased, bringing the tally to 160,335. All 514 municipalities and regencies had reported at least one positive case.
 As of 17:44 (UTC+7), 203,882,275 people had taken the first dose of vaccine, 174,532,007 had completed the second dose, and 67,797,883 had been inoculated with the third dose. 1,067,808 health professionals and elderlies had received the second booster shot.
 16 December
 113,350,160 specimens had been tested from 73,083,146 people using RT-PCR, TCM, and antigen rapid tests. There were 3,327 suspected cases.
 Indonesia confirmed 1,451 new cases, bringing the total number to 6,707,504. 2,806 patients recovered, bringing the number to 6,515,100. 27 patients deceased, bringing the tally to 160,362. All 514 municipalities and regencies had reported at least one positive case.
 As of 17:16 (UTC+7), 203,893,870 people had taken the first dose of vaccine, 174,551,723 had completed the second dose, and 67,864,300 had been inoculated with the third dose. 1,080,023 health professionals and elderlies had received the second booster shot.
 The number of active cases was 32,042, the lowest since 2 November 2022.
 17 December
 113,388,504 specimens had been tested from 73,108,369 people using RT-PCR, TCM, and antigen rapid tests. There were 2,887 suspected cases.
 Indonesia confirmed 1,233 new cases, bringing the total number to 6,708,737. 2,369 patients recovered, bringing the number to 6,517,469. 22 patients deceased, bringing the tally to 160,384. All 514 municipalities and regencies had reported at least one positive case.
 As of 23:59 (UTC+7), 203,903,137 people had taken the first dose of vaccine, 174,573,516 had completed the second dose, and 67,915,745 had been inoculated with the third dose. 1,088,555 health professionals and elderlies had received the second booster shot.
 The number of active cases was 30,884, the lowest since 2 November 2022.
 18 December
 113,415,386 specimens had been tested from 73,126,590 people using RT-PCR, TCM, and antigen rapid tests. There were 1,720 suspected cases.
 Indonesia confirmed 860 new cases – the lowest since 13 June 2022, bringing the total number to 6,709,597. 2,035 patients recovered, bringing the number to 6,519,504. 14 patients deceased – the lowest since 23 October 2022, bringing the tally to 160,398. All 514 municipalities and regencies had reported at least one positive case.
 As of 23:59 (UTC+7), 203,908,976 people had taken the first dose of vaccine, 174,589,982 had completed the second dose, and 67,954,132 had been inoculated with the third dose. 1,093,583 health professionals and elderlies had received the second booster shot.
 The number of active cases was 29,695, the lowest since 1 November 2022.
 19 December
 113,459,315 specimens had been tested from 73,155,944 people using RT-PCR, TCM, and antigen rapid tests. There were 2,237 suspected cases.
 Indonesia confirmed 809 new cases – the lowest since 13 June 2022, bringing the total number to 6,710,406. 3,240 patients recovered, bringing the number to 6,522,744. 26 patients deceased, bringing the tally to 160,424. All 514 municipalities and regencies had reported at least one positive case.
 As of 20:40 (UTC+7), 203,920,659 people had taken the first dose of vaccine, 174,609,714 had completed the second dose, and 68,000,070 had been inoculated with the third dose. 1,099,439 health professionals and elderlies had received the second booster shot.
 The number of active cases was 27,238, the lowest since 31 October 2022.
 20 December
 113,515,906 specimens had been tested from 73,195,978 people using RT-PCR, TCM, and antigen rapid tests. There were 3,453 suspected cases.
 Indonesia confirmed 1,297 new cases, bringing the total number to 6,711,703. 2,781 patients recovered, bringing the number to 6,525,525. 27 patients deceased, bringing the tally to 160,451. All 514 municipalities and regencies had reported at least one positive case.
 As of 18:16 (UTC+7), 203,929,864 people had taken the first dose of vaccine, 174,624,183 had completed the second dose, and 68,043,122 had been inoculated with the third dose. 1,104,246 health professionals and elderlies had received the second booster shot.
 The number of active cases was 25,727, the lowest since 31 October 2022.
 21 December
 113,562,024 specimens had been tested from 73,229,587 people using RT-PCR, TCM, and antigen rapid tests. There were 3,091 suspected cases.
 Indonesia confirmed 1,123 new cases, bringing the total number to 6,712,826. 2,427 patients recovered, bringing the number to 6,527,952. 15 patients deceased, bringing the tally to 160,466. All 514 municipalities and regencies had reported at least one positive case.
 As of 23:59 (UTC+7), 203,941,941 people had taken the first dose of vaccine, 174,648,922 had completed the second dose, and 68,142,484 had been inoculated with the third dose. 1,120,823 health professionals and elderlies had received the second booster shot.
 The number of active cases was 24,408, the lowest since 29 October 2022.
 22 December
 113,609,861 specimens had been tested from 73,262,078 people using RT-PCR, TCM, and antigen rapid tests. There were 2,944 suspected cases.
 Indonesia confirmed 1,053 new cases, bringing the total number to 6,713,879. 2,324 patients recovered, bringing the number to 6,530,276. 22 patients deceased, bringing the tally to 160,488. All 514 municipalities and regencies had reported at least one positive case.
 As of 19:40 (UTC+7), 203,952,641 people had taken the first dose of vaccine, 174,666,157 had completed the second dose, and 68,201,141 had been inoculated with the third dose. 1,130,087 health professionals and elderlies had received the second booster shot.
 The number of active cases was 23,115, the lowest since 28 October 2022.
 23 December
 113,650,358 specimens had been tested from 73,291,514 people using RT-PCR, TCM, and antigen rapid tests. There were 2,972 suspected cases.
 Indonesia confirmed 923 new cases, bringing the total number to 6,714,802. 2,812 patients recovered, bringing the number to 6,533,088. 19 patients deceased, bringing the tally to 160,507. All 514 municipalities and regencies had reported at least one positive case.
 As of 23:59 (UTC+7), 203,958,661 people had taken the first dose of vaccine, 174,678,659 had completed the second dose, and 68,243,925 had been inoculated with the third dose. 1,137,049 health professionals and elderlies had received the second booster shot.
 The number of active cases was 21,207, the lowest since 25 October 2022.
 24 December
 113,681,063 specimens had been tested from 73,312,868 people using RT-PCR, TCM, and antigen rapid tests. There were 2,164 suspected cases.
 Indonesia confirmed 784 new cases – the lowest since 13 June 2022, bringing the total number to 6,715,586. 2,812 patients recovered, bringing the number to 6,534,382. 17 patients deceased, bringing the tally to 160,524. All 514 municipalities and regencies had reported at least one positive case.
 As of 23:59 (UTC+7), 203,958,661 people had taken the first dose of vaccine, 174,678,659 had completed the second dose, and 68,243,925 had been inoculated with the third dose. 1,137,049 health professionals and elderlies had received the second booster shot.
 The number of active cases was 20,680, the lowest since 25 October 2022.
 25 December
 113,702,073 specimens had been tested from 73,327,414 people using RT-PCR, TCM, and antigen rapid tests. There were 1,624 suspected cases.
 Indonesia confirmed 538 new cases – the lowest since 8 June 2022, bringing the total number to 6,716,124. 974 patients recovered, bringing the number to 6,535,356. 13 patients deceased – the lowest since 23 October 2022, bringing the tally to 160,537. All 514 municipalities and regencies had reported at least one positive case.
 As of 23:59 (UTC+7), 203,976,580 people had taken the first dose of vaccine, 174,698,498 had completed the second dose, and 68,301,936 had been inoculated with the third dose. 1,143,126 health professionals and elderlies had received the second booster shot.
 The number of active cases was 20,231, the lowest since 25 October 2022.
 26 December
 113,734,156 specimens had been tested from 73,349,357 people using RT-PCR, TCM, and antigen rapid tests. There were 1,614 suspected cases.
 Indonesia confirmed 468 new cases – the lowest since 6 June 2022, bringing the total number to 6,716,592. 3,212 patients recovered, bringing the number to 6,538,568. 14 patients deceased, bringing the tally to 160,551. All 514 municipalities and regencies had reported at least one positive case.
 As of 17:55 (UTC+7), 203,985,207 people had taken the first dose of vaccine, 174,711,797 had completed the second dose, and 68,347,692 had been inoculated with the third dose. 1,147,864 health professionals and elderlies had received the second booster shot.
 The number of active cases was 17,473, the lowest since 17 October 2022.
 27 December
 113,776,371 specimens had been tested from 73,378,850 people using RT-PCR, TCM, and antigen rapid tests. There were 2,968 suspected cases.
 Indonesia confirmed 803 new cases, bringing the total number to 6,717,395. 1,692 patients recovered, bringing the number to 6,540,260. 9 patients deceased – the lowest since 9 October 2022, bringing the tally to 160,560. All 514 municipalities and regencies had reported at least one positive case.
 As of 19:00 (UTC+7), 203,996,807 people had taken the first dose of vaccine, 174,728,238 had completed the second dose, and 68,401,356 had been inoculated with the third dose. 1,154,265 health professionals and elderlies had received the second booster shot.
 The number of active cases was 16,575, the lowest since 11 October 2022.
 28 December
 113,814,108 specimens had been tested from 73,406,478 people using RT-PCR, TCM, and antigen rapid tests. There were 2,779 suspected cases.
 Indonesia confirmed 695 new cases, bringing the total number to 6,718,090. 2,531 patients recovered, bringing the number to 6,542,791. 14 patients deceased, bringing the tally to 160,574. All 514 municipalities and regencies had reported at least one positive case.
 As of 23:59 (UTC+7), 204,004,032 people had taken the first dose of vaccine, 174,739,865 had completed the second dose, and 68,442,355 had been inoculated with the third dose. 1,160,214 health professionals and elderlies had received the second booster shot.
 The number of active cases was 14,725, the lowest since 27 June 2022.
 29 December
 113,850,710 specimens had been tested from 73,433,265 people using RT-PCR, TCM, and antigen rapid tests. There were 2,678 suspected cases.
 Indonesia confirmed 685 new cases, bringing the total number to 6,718,775. 1,437 patients recovered, bringing the number to 6,544,228. 9 patients deceased – the joint-lowest since 9 October 2022, bringing the tally to 160,583. All 514 municipalities and regencies had reported at least one positive case.
 As of 16:45 (UTC+7), 204,014,895 people had taken the first dose of vaccine, 174,755,560 had completed the second dose, and 68,492,422 had been inoculated with the third dose. 1,165,775 health professionals and elderlies had received the second booster shot.
 The number of active cases was 13,964, the lowest since 24 June 2022.
 30 December
 113,881,715 specimens had been tested from 73,452,990 people using RT-PCR, TCM, and antigen rapid tests. There were 2,401 suspected cases.
 Indonesia confirmed 552 new cases, bringing the total number to 6,719,327. 904 patients recovered, bringing the number to 6,545,132. 10 patients deceased, bringing the tally to 160,593. All 514 municipalities and regencies had reported at least one positive case.
 As of 17:40 (UTC+7), 204,023,209 people had taken the first dose of vaccine, 174,767,748 had completed the second dose, and 68,528,824 had been inoculated with the third dose. 1,169,629 health professionals and elderlies had received the second booster shot.
 The number of active cases was 13,602, the lowest since 24 June 2022.
 31 December
 113,906,941 specimens had been tested from 73,470,531 people using RT-PCR, TCM, and antigen rapid tests. There were 1,877 suspected cases.
 Indonesia confirmed 488 new cases, bringing the total number to 6,719,815. 4,200 patients recovered, bringing the number to 6,549,332. 19 patients deceased, bringing the tally to 160,612. All 514 municipalities and regencies had reported at least one positive case.
 As of 10:22 (UTC+7), 204,026,564 people had taken the first dose of vaccine, 174,771,880 had completed the second dose, and 68,537,551 had been inoculated with the third dose. 1,169,962 health professionals and elderlies had received the second booster shot.
 The number of active cases was 9,871, the lowest since 20 June 2022.

See also 
 2022 in Indonesia
 COVID-19 vaccination in Indonesia
 Statistics of the COVID-19 pandemic in Indonesia

References 

COVID-19 pandemic in Indonesia
Indonesia